= Marek Gazdzicki =

Polish physicist

Marek Gaździcki
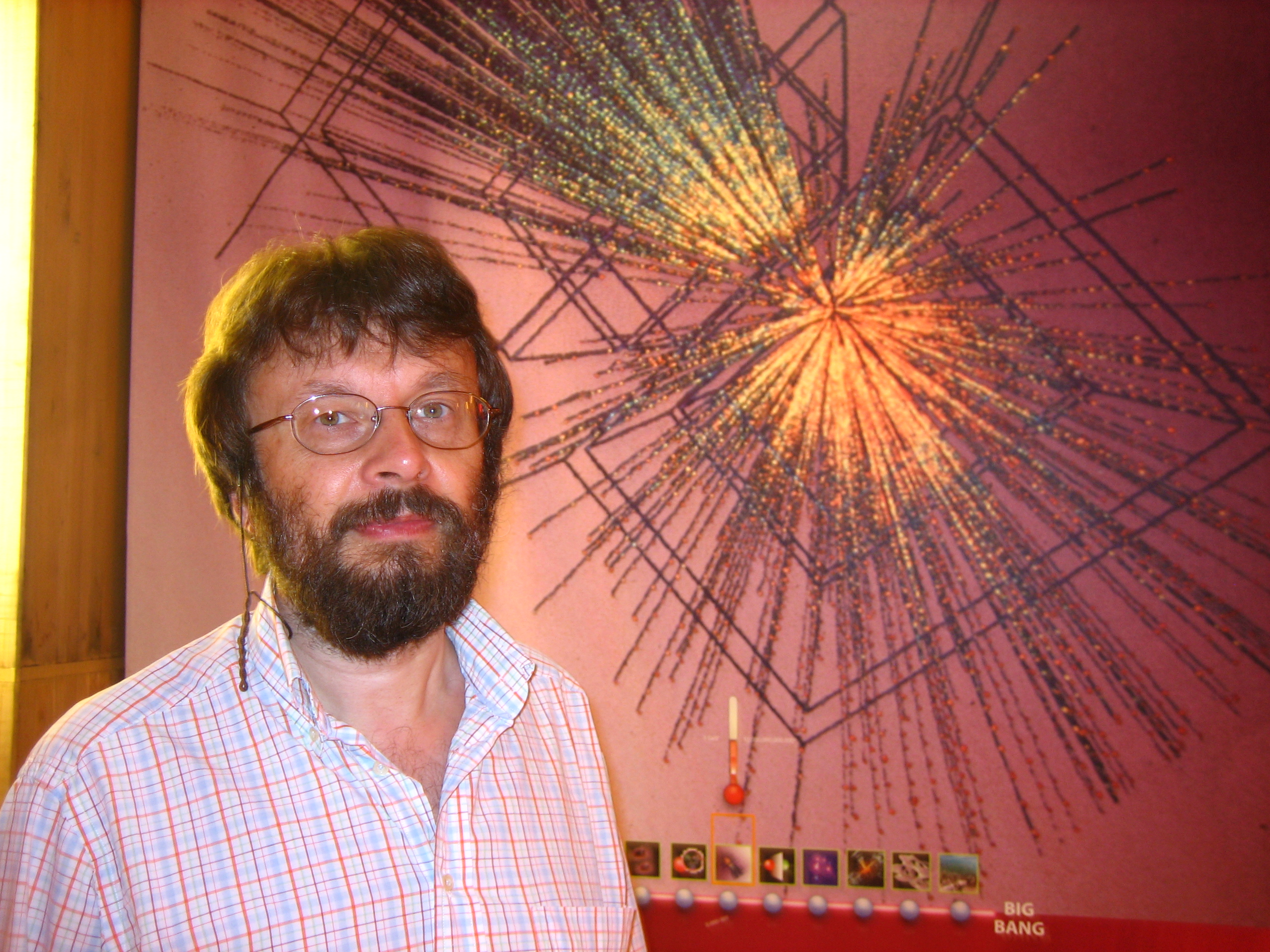
- Born: 9 June 1956 (age 70); Warsaw, Poland
- Education: Warsaw University; University of Frankfurt/Main
- Known for: Onset of deconfinement
- Scientific career
- Fields: High-energy physics, hadron physics, nuclear physics
- Workplaces: Joint Institute for Nuclear Research; Jan Kochanowski University; University of Heidelberg; University of Frankfurt/Main; CERN (SPS)

Marek Gaździcki (born 9 June 1956) is a Polish high-energy nuclear physicist, and the initiator and spokesperson of the NA61/SHINE experiment at the CERN Super Proton Synchrotron (SPS).

He, along with Mark I. Gorenstein, predicted the threshold energy of the quark–gluon plasma production (the so-called "onset of deconfinement") in high energy nucleus-nucleus collisions. These predictions have been confirmed by the NA49 experiment at the CERN SPS within the energy scan programme which was started by him and Peter Seyboth.

== Biography ==
Gaździcki was born on 9 June 1956 in Warsaw, Poland, as the son of Teresa and Jerzy Gaździcki. Living with his parents and his younger brother Pawel in Warsaw, he went to primary school in 1964 and graduated from high school in 1976. He studied physics at the Warsaw University from 1976 to 1980. After completing his first scientific degree, he married Maria Magdalena Klink, a computer scientist, who graduated from the Warsaw University of Technology.

In the time from 1981 to 1984 he moved to Russia, where he became a researcher at the Joint Institute for Nuclear Research in Dubna. Back in Poland, he received his PhD in Physics, and became a lecturer at the Warsaw University in the time from 1989 to 1992. Additionally, he worked as a researcher at the University of Heidelberg (1986–1988) and at the University of Frankfurt/Main.

Since 1992 he has been continuing studies as a Scientific Associate at the University of Frankfurt/M and from 2000 to 2001 at CERN, in Geneva, Switzerland. Since 2003, he holds a professorship at the Jan Kochanowski University in Kielce, Poland, and works as researcher and outside lecturer at the University of Frankfurt/Main. In 2004 he became spokesperson of the Virtual Institute of the Helmholtz Association of German Research Centres: "Physics of Strongly Interacting Matter at High Densities" and in 2007 spokesperson of the NA61/SHINE experiment at the CERN SPS.

Marek Gaździcki currently lives with his wife and three children in the area of Frankfurt/M, Germany.

== Research ==
The most significant subjects investigated by Gaździcki are:

- 1980–1986: Nucleus-nucleus interactions at 4.5A GeV (Dubna and Warsaw)
- 1986–1992: Collisions of light nuclei at 20A GeV (Frankfurt/Main, Heidelberg and Warsaw)
- 1992–1996: Pb+Pb collisions at 158A GeV (CERN and Frankfurt/Main)
- 1994–1999: Predictions of the threshold for quark–gluon plasma production (Frankfurt/Main)
- 1997–2007: Evidence for the threshold at the low SPS energies (CERN and Frankfurt/Main)
- since 1999: Low cross-section phenomena in Pb+Pb collisions at 158A GeV (CERN and Frankfurt/Main)
- 1990–1993: STAR experiment at the Relativistic Heavy Ion Collider (RHIC) (Warsaw and Frankfurt/Main)
- since 1992: Event-by-event fluctuations and the ALICE experiment at the Large Hadron Collider (LHC) (Warsaw, Frankfurt/Main and CERN)
- since 1998: Quarkonium production and high p_{T} phenomena (CERN and Frankfurt/Main)
- since 2003: NA61/SHINE experiment at the CERN SPS (Frankfurt/Main and Kielce)

Selected achievements of Gaździcki's work are described as follows:

1980–1986: Nucleus-nucleus interactions at 4.5A GeV (Dubna and Warsaw)

Starting in 1980, Gaździcki participated in the SKM200 experiment at the Dubna Synchrophasotron, focusing on the investigation of hadron production in (He–Mg)+(Li–Pb) collisions at 4.5A GeV using a streamer chamber. The main results – which constituted the basis for his PhD thesis – were the first measurements of strange hadron production in relativistic nucleus–nucleus collisions and a first observation of strange hadron yield enhancement in central A+A collisions.

1986–1992: Collisions of light nuclei at 200A GeV (Frankfurt/Main, Heidelberg and Warsaw)

Subsequently, (1986–1992) he took part in the NA35 experiment at the CERN SPS, where he studied hadron production in (^{16}O, ^{32}S)+(S–Pb) collisions at 200A GeV using a large volume streamer chamber. Here, a first observation of the enhancement of strange hadron production in A+A collisions at the SPS energies constituted the cardinal outcome of this experiment. This result constituted the main part of Gazdzicki's habilitation.

1992–1996: Pb+Pb collisions at 158A GeV (CERN and Frankfurt/Main)

In 1992, Gaździcki began working on the NA49 experiment, which was based on time projection chambers, the time of flight detectors and calorimeters. The study of central Pb+Pb collisions at the top SPS energy confirmed the main result from the study of S+S interactions: the enhancement of strange hadron production in nucleus–nucleus collisions.

1994–1999: Predictions of the threshold for quark–gluon plasma production (Frankfurt/Main)

Gaździcki's further work (1994–1999) was focused on the compilation, analysis and the interpretation of experimental results on system size and energy dependence of pion and strangeness production in A+A collisions, as well as the development of statistical models of strong interactions. Based upon these testings, Gaździcki observed the anomaly in energy dependence of pion and strange hadron yields in A+A collisions.

Furthermore, he suggested that this anomaly is due to the transition to deconfinement matter occurring between top AGS (15A GeV) and top SPS (158A GeV) energies. Lastly, along with Mark Gorenstein, he formulated the statistical model of the early stage which is a basis for the quantitative description of the observed effects, and further predictions concerning the threshold for the quark–gluon plasma production.

1997-2007: Evidence for the threshold at the low SPS energies (CERN and Frankfurt/Main)

Based upon these results in 1997 Gaździcki, together with Peter Seyboth, initiated the energy scan with Pb+Pb collisions at the CERN SPS which was performed by NA49 from 1998 to 2002. The main results of this programme are: the observation of the onset of the steepening of energy dependence of pion yield at about 30A GeV (kink), the observation of the non-monotonic energy dependence of positively charged kaon to pion ratio with the maximum located close to 30A GeV (horn), and the observation of the anomaly in energy dependence of the transverse mass spectra of kaons (step) located in the SPS energy range. These observations serve as evidence for the onset of deconfinement at the CERN SPS energies.

Since 1992: Event-by-event fluctuations (Warsaw, Frankfurt/Main and CERN)

In 1992 he started along with his collaborators the work on the development of statistical methods for the study of event-by-event fluctuations, as well as the study of physics of event-by-event fluctuations in A+A collisions. The most important results are the introduction of the commonly used measure of event-by-event fluctuations, and the cumulative variable for the correlation/fluctuation study, as well as the study of fluctuations and statistical models with conserved quantities.

Since 1998: Quarkonium production and high p_{T} phenomena (CERN and Frankfurt/Main)

Since 1998, Gaździcki, together with Mark Gorenstein, has been aiming at the compilation and interpretation of the data on the production of high (transverse) mass mesons, and at the development of the statistical model of strong interactions for high (transverse) mass domain. As a result, they discovered the independence of the J/ψ to the pion ratio of the system size in A+A collisions at 158A GeV. Moreover, they formulated the hypothesis of the statistical production of J/ψ mesons, and they found the m_{T} power-law scaling in high m_{T} domain in proton-proton interactions at high energies. Conclusively, the statistical interpretation of the scaling was formulated.

Since 2003: NA61/SHINE experiment at the CERN SPS (Frankfurt/Main and Kielce)

Motivated by the discovery of the threshold of the quark–gluon plasma production in 2003 Gaździcki initiated and became spokesperson of the NA61/SHINE experiment. The principal goals of this experiment are: the search of the critical point of strongly interacting matter, the study of the properties of the onset of deconfinement in nucleus-nucleus collisions and precision measurements of hadron production in nuclear interactions for neutrino (T2K) and cosmic-ray (Pierre Auger Observatory and KASCADE) experiments.
