= List of unsolved problems in physics =

Some of the major unsolved problems in physics are theoretical, meaning that existing theories are currently unable to explain certain observed phenomena or experimental results. Others are experimental, involving challenges in creating experiments to test proposed theories or to investigate specific phenomena in greater detail.

A number of important questions remain open in the area of physics beyond the Standard Model, such as the strong CP problem, determining the absolute mass of neutrinos, understanding matter–antimatter asymmetry, and identifying the nature of dark matter and dark energy.

Another significant problem lies within the mathematical framework of the Standard Model itself, which remains inconsistent with general relativity. This incompatibility causes both theories to break down under extreme conditions, such as within known spacetime gravitational singularities like those at the Big Bang and at the centers of black holes beyond their event horizons.

== Historical problems and lists ==
Isaac Newton in his book Opticks (first edition 1704), published a list of 31 queries about light and matter.

In 1900, Lord Kelvin in a speech identified two main issues in classical physics that represented "two clouds" for the physics of 20th century: the lack of evidence for the existence of the luminiferous aether and the failures of the equipartition theorem in predicting the heat capacity of solids. Both problems were solved within a decade with the development of special relativity and quantum mechanics respectively.

In 1982, Roger Penrose proposed a list of mathematical physics problems related to general relativity, about 14 problems remain unsolved as of 2017. A similar list of 53 problems was made by Robert Bartnik in 1988.

In 1984, mathematical physicist Barry Simon proposed a list of 15 open problems on quantum operators (about 5 already solved in 2000). A second list of 15 Simon problems was released in 2000 (at least 3 problems solved).

Nobel laureate Vitaly Ginzburg is known for having compiled from 1971 to 2005, a list of open problems in physics on "the verge of the 21st century", the final list includes 30 problems. Ginzburg also included three "great problems": the problem of the arrow of time, the interpretations of quantum mechanics and life arising from physics alone.

During the Strings 2000 conference a list of 10 millennium problems in theoretical physics was proposed by its members, none has been conclusively solved as of 2025.

=== Mathematical lists ===
Some mathematical physics problems are included in notable lists of unsolved problems in mathematics, these include:

- The sixth problem of 1900 Hilbert's problems about the axiomatization of physics, the problem is either ill-defined or partially solved.
- The Navier–Stokes existence and smoothness and the Yang–Mills existence and mass gap problems of the Millennium Prize Problems, both remain unsolved.
- Navier–Stokes smoothness is also the 15th Smale's problem from 1998.
- United States DARPA issued 23 mathematical challenges in 2008. Physics problems included: advancing techniques in modelling fluid dynamics and soft matter, developing mathematics for quantum computing, applying quantum field theory and action principles to biology, and finding a relation between the geometric Langlands program and quantum physics.

== List by topic ==
=== General physics ===
- Theory of everything: Is there a singular, all-encompassing, coherent theoretical framework of physics that fully explains and links together all physical aspects of the universe?
- Dimensionless physical constants: At the present time, the values of various dimensionless physical constants cannot be calculated; they can be determined only by physical measurement. What is the minimum number of dimensionless physical constants from which all other dimensionless physical constants can be derived? Are dimensional physical constants necessary at all?

=== Quantum gravity ===
- Quantum gravity: Can quantum mechanics and general relativity be realized as a fully consistent theory (perhaps as a quantum field theory)? Would a consistent theory involve a force mediated by a hypothetical graviton, or be a product of a discrete structure of spacetime itself (as in loop quantum gravity)? Are there deviations from the predictions of general relativity at very small or very large scales or in other extreme circumstances that flow from a quantum gravity mechanism?
- Black holes, black hole information paradox, and black hole radiation: Do black holes produce thermal radiation, as expected on theoretical grounds? Does this radiation contain information about their inner structure, as suggested by gauge–gravity duality, or not, as implied by Hawking's original calculation? If not, and black holes can evaporate away, what happens to the information stored in them (since quantum mechanics does not provide for the destruction of information)? Or does the radiation stop at some point, leaving black hole remnants? Is there another way to probe their internal structure somehow, if such a structure even exists?
- The cosmic censorship hypothesis and the chronology protection conjecture: Can singularities not hidden behind an event horizon, known as "naked singularities", arise from realistic initial conditions, or is it possible to prove some version of the "cosmic censorship hypothesis" of Roger Penrose which proposes that this is impossible? Similarly, will the closed timelike curves which arise in some solutions to the equations of general relativity (and which imply the possibility of backwards time travel) be ruled out by a theory of quantum gravity which unites general relativity with quantum mechanics, as suggested by the "chronology protection conjecture" of Stephen Hawking?
- Holographic principle: Is it true that quantum gravity admits a lower-dimensional description that does not contain gravity? A well-understood example of holography is the AdS/CFT correspondence in string theory. Similarly, can quantum gravity in a de Sitter space be understood using dS/CFT correspondence? Can the AdS/CFT correspondence be vastly generalized to the gauge–gravity duality for arbitrary asymptotic spacetime backgrounds? Are there other theories of quantum gravity other than string theory that admit a holographic description?
- Quantum spacetime or the emergence of spacetime: Is the nature of spacetime at the Planck scale very different from the continuous classical dynamical spacetime that exists in general relativity? In loop quantum gravity, the spacetime is postulated to be discrete from the beginning. In string theory, although originally spacetime was considered just like in general relativity (with the only difference being supersymmetry), recent research building upon the Ryu–Takayanagi conjecture has taught that spacetime in string theory is emergent by using quantum information theoretic concepts such as entanglement entropy in the AdS/CFT correspondence. However, how exactly the familiar classical spacetime emerges within string theory or the AdS/CFT correspondence is still not well understood.
- Problem of time: In quantum mechanics, time is a classical background parameter, and the flow of time is universal and absolute. In general relativity, time is one component of four-dimensional spacetime, and the flow of time changes depending on the curvature of spacetime and the spacetime trajectory of the observer. How can these two concepts of time be reconciled?

=== Quantum physics ===
- Yang–Mills theory: Given an arbitrary compact gauge group, does a non-trivial quantum Yang–Mills theory with a finite mass gap exist? (This problem is also listed as one of the Millennium Prize Problems in mathematics.)
- Quantum field theory (this is a generalization of the previous problem): Is it possible to construct, in a mathematically rigorous way, a quantum field theory in 4-dimensional spacetime that includes interactions and does not resort to perturbative methods?

=== Cosmology and general relativity ===
- Cosmic inflation: Is the theory of cosmic inflation in the very early universe correct, and, if so, what are the details of this epoch? What is the hypothetical inflaton scalar field that gave rise to this cosmic inflation? If inflation happened at one point, is it self-sustaining through inflation of quantum-mechanical fluctuations, and thus ongoing in some extremely distant place?
- Cosmic coincidence problem: the energy densities of dark energy and dark matter are of the same order of magnitude in the Universe. Dark matter energy density decreased during the evolution of the universe, so it must have been very large in the past. Is there any relation between the two energy densities?
- Horizon problem: Why is the distant universe so homogeneous when the Big Bang theory seems to predict larger measurable anisotropies of the night sky than those observed? Cosmological inflation is generally accepted as the solution, but are other possible explanations such as a variable speed of light more appropriate?
- Origin and future of the universe: How did the conditions for anything to exist arise? Is the universe heading towards a Big Freeze, a Big Rip, a Big Crunch, or a Big Bounce?
- Size of universe: The diameter of the observable universe is about 93 billion light-years (or equivalently a radius of about 14 Gpc), but what is the size of the whole universe? Is the universe infinite?
- Matter–antimatter asymmetry: Theoretical models suggest that the early universe should have produced equal amounts of matter and antimatter. However, observations indicate no significant primordial antimatter. Understanding the mechanisms that led to this asymmetry is a major unsolved problem in physics.
- Cosmological principle: Is the universe homogeneous and isotropic at large enough scales, as claimed by the cosmological principle and assumed by all models that use the Friedmann–Lemaître–Robertson–Walker metric, including the current version of the ΛCDM model, or is the universe inhomogeneous or anisotropic? Is the CMB dipole purely kinematic, or does it signal anisotropy of the universe, resulting in the breakdown of the FLRW metric and the cosmological principle? Is the Hubble tension evidence that the cosmological principle is false? Even if the cosmological principle is correct, is the Friedmann–Lemaître–Robertson–Walker metric the right metric to use for our universe? Are the observations usually interpreted as the accelerating expansion of the universe rightly interpreted, or are they instead evidence that the cosmological principle is false?

Estimated distribution of dark matter and dark energy in the universe

- Dark matter: What is the identity of dark matter? Is it a particle? If so, is it a WIMP, axion, the lightest superpartner (LSP), or some other particle? Or, are the phenomena attributed to dark matter the result of an alternate theory of gravity separate from general relativity altogether? Despite extensive research, the exact composition of dark matter remains unknown. It is inferred from gravitational effects on visible matter, radiation, and the universe's large-scale structure. Understanding its properties is crucial for a comprehensive understanding of the universe.
- Dark energy: What is the cause of the observed accelerating expansion of the universe (the de Sitter phase)? Are the observations rightly interpreted as the accelerating expansion of the universe, or are they evidence that the cosmological principle is false? Why is the energy density of the dark energy component of the same magnitude as the density of matter at present when the two evolve quite differently over time; could it be simply that we are observing at exactly the right time? Is dark energy a pure cosmological constant or are models of quintessence such as phantom energy applicable?
- Dark flow: Is a non-spherically-symmetric gravitational pull from outside the observable universe responsible for some of the observed motion of large objects such as galactic clusters in the universe?
- Shape of the universe: What is the 3-manifold of comoving space, i.e., of a comoving spatial section of the universe, informally called the "shape" of the universe? The topology is not presently known, though the curvature is known to be "close" to zero on observable scales. Is the shape unmeasurable; the Poincaré space; or another 3-manifold?
- Extra dimensions: Does nature have more than four spacetime dimensions? If so, what is their size? Are dimensions a fundamental property of the universe or an emergent result of other physical laws? Can we experimentally observe evidence of higher spatial dimensions?
- Hubble tension: The value of H_{0}, which encodes the current expansion rate of the universe, has two values: one from near-universe measurements and one from cosmic microwave background measurements combined with the Lambda-CDM model. These two values disagree to a high degree of statistical confidence (5.7σ). Are there systematic measurement errors? A problem in the otherwise widely successful model?

=== High-energy/particle physics ===
- Cosmological constant problem: Why does the zero-point energy of the vacuum not cause a large cosmological constant? What cancels it out?
- Hierarchy problem: The ratio between the strong force and gravity is on the order of 10^{−20}. Why is gravity so much weaker than the strong force?
- Magnetic monopoles: Did particles that carry "magnetic charge" exist in some past, higher-energy epoch? If so, do any remain today? (Paul Dirac showed the existence of some types of magnetic monopoles would explain charge quantization.)
- Neutron lifetime puzzle: While the neutron lifetime has been studied for decades, there currently exists a lack of consilience on its exact value, due to different results from two experimental methods ("bottle" versus "beam").
- Proton decay and spin crisis: Is the proton fundamentally stable? Or does it decay with a finite lifetime as predicted by some extensions to the standard model? How do the quarks and gluons carry the spin of protons?
- Grand Unification: Are the electromagnetic and nuclear forces different aspects of a Grand Unified Theory? If so, what symmetry governs this force and its behaviours?
- Supersymmetry: Is spacetime supersymmetry realized at higher TeV scale? If so, what is the mechanism of supersymmetry breaking? Does supersymmetry stabilize the grand unified scale, preventing high quantum corrections?
- Color confinement: The quantum chromodynamics (QCD) color confinement conjecture is that color-charged particles (such as quarks and gluons) cannot be separated from their parent hadron without producing new hadrons. Is it possible to provide an analytic proof of color confinement in any non-abelian gauge theory?

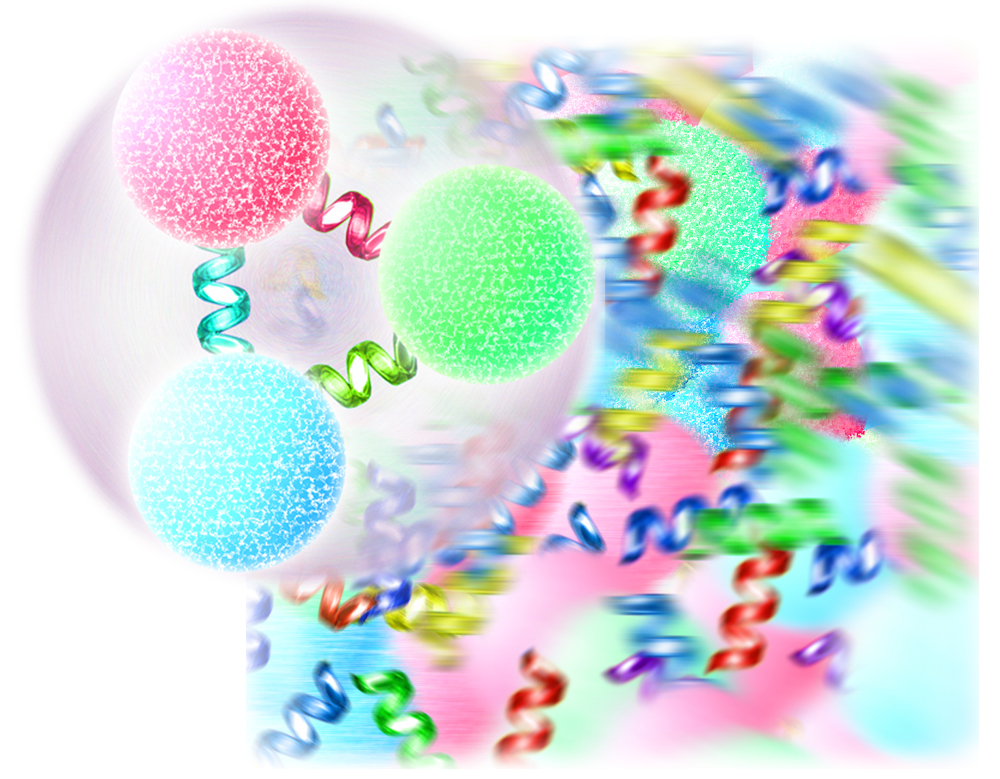
Colour Confinement is the observed phenomenon that colored particles (quarks and gluons) cannot be isolated and are always bound to color neutral groups (at low energies). Such bound states are generally called hadrons.

- The QCD vacuum: Many of the equations in non-perturbative QCD are currently unsolved. These energies are the energies sufficient for the formation and description of atomic nuclei. How thus does low energy /non-pertubative QCD give rise to the formation of complex nuclei and nuclear constituents?
- Generations of matter: Why are there three generations of quarks and leptons? Is there a theory that can explain the masses of particular quarks and leptons in particular generations from first principles (a theory of Yukawa couplings)?
- Neutrino mass: What is the absolute mass of neutrinos? Are they Dirac or Majorana fermions? Is the mass hierarchy normal or inverted? Is the CP violating phase equal to 0?
- Reactor antineutrino anomaly: There is an anomaly in the existing body of data regarding the antineutrino flux from nuclear reactors around the world. Measured values of this flux appears to be only 94% of the value expected from theory. It is unknown whether this is due to unknown physics (such as sterile neutrinos), experimental error in the measurements, or errors in the theoretical flux calculations.
- Strong CP problem and axions: Why is the strong nuclear interaction invariant to parity and charge conjugation? Is Peccei–Quinn theory the solution to this problem? Could axions be the main component of dark matter?
- Anomalous magnetic dipole moment: Why is the experimentally measured value of the muon's anomalous magnetic dipole moment ("muon g − 2") significantly different from the theoretically predicted value of that physical constant?
- Pentaquarks and other exotic hadrons: What combinations of quarks are possible? Are they a tightly bound system of five elementary particles, or a more weakly-bound pairing of a baryon and a meson?
- Mu problem: A problem in supersymmetric theories, concerned with understanding the reasons for parameter values of the theory.
- Koide formula: An aspect of the problem of particle generations. The sum of the masses of the three charged leptons, divided by the square of the sum of the roots of these masses, to within one standard deviation of observations, is Q = 2/3. It is unknown how such a simple value comes about, and why it is the exact arithmetic average of the possible extreme values of 1/3 (equal masses) and 1 (one mass dominates).
- Strange matter: Does strange matter exist? Is it stable? Can they form strange stars? Is strange matter stable at 0 pressure (i.e. in the vacuum)?
- Glueballs: Do they exist in nature?
- Gallium anomaly: The measurements of the charged-current capture rate of neutrinos on Ga from strong radioactive sources have yielded results below those expected, based on the known strength of the principal transition supplemented by theory.

=== Astronomy and astrophysics ===
- Solar cycle: How does the Sun generate its periodically reversing large-scale magnetic field? How do other solar-like stars generate their magnetic fields, and what are the similarities and differences between stellar activity cycles and that of the Sun? What caused the Maunder Minimum and other grand minima, and how does the solar cycle recover from a minima state?
- Coronal heating problem: Why is the Sun's corona (atmosphere layer) so much hotter than the Sun's surface? Why is the magnetic reconnection effect many orders of magnitude faster than predicted by standard models?
- Astrophysical jet: Why do only certain accretion discs surrounding certain astronomical objects emit relativistic jets along their polar axes? Why are there quasi-periodic oscillations in many accretion discs? Why does the period of these oscillations scale as the inverse of the mass of the central object? Why are there sometimes overtones, and why do these appear at different frequency ratios in different objects?
- Diffuse interstellar bands: What is responsible for the numerous interstellar absorption lines detected in astronomical spectra? Are they molecular in origin, and if so which molecules are responsible for them? How do they form?
- Supermassive black holes: What is the origin of the M–sigma relation between supermassive black hole mass and galaxy velocity dispersion? How did the most distant quasars grow their supermassive black holes up to 10^{10} solar masses so early in the history of the universe?
- Kuiper cliff: Why does the number of objects in the Solar System's Kuiper belt fall off rapidly and unexpectedly beyond a radius of 50 astronomical units?
- Flyby anomaly: Why is the observed energy of satellites flying by planetary bodies sometimes different by a minute amount from the value predicted by theory?
- Galaxy rotation problem: Is dark matter responsible for differences in observed and theoretical speed of stars revolving around the centre of galaxies, or is it something else?
  Rotation curve of a typical spiral galaxy: predicted (A) and observed (B). Can the discrepancy between the curves be attributed to dark matter?
- Supernovae: What is the exact mechanism by which an implosion of a dying star becomes an explosion?
- p-nuclei: What astrophysical process is responsible for the nucleogenesis of these rare isotopes?
- Ultra-high-energy cosmic ray: Why is it that some cosmic rays appear to possess energies that are impossibly high, given that there are no sufficiently energetic cosmic ray sources near the Earth? Why is it that (apparently) some cosmic rays emitted by distant sources have energies above the Greisen–Zatsepin–Kuzmin limit?
- Rotation rate of Saturn: Why does the magnetosphere of Saturn exhibit a (slowly changing) periodicity close to that at which the planet's clouds rotate? What is the true rotation rate of Saturn's deep interior?
- Origin of magnetar magnetic field: What is the origin of magnetar magnetic fields?
- Large-scale anisotropy: Is the universe at very large scales anisotropic, making the cosmological principle an invalid assumption? The number count and intensity dipole anisotropy in radio, NRAO VLA Sky Survey (NVSS) catalogue is inconsistent with the local motion as derived from cosmic microwave background and indicate an intrinsic dipole anisotropy. The same NVSS radio data also shows an intrinsic dipole in polarization density and degree of polarization in the same direction as in number count and intensity. There are several other observations revealing large-scale anisotropy. The optical polarization from quasars shows polarization alignment over a very large scale of Gpc. The cosmic-microwave-background data shows several features of anisotropy, which are not consistent with the Big Bang model.
- Age–metallicity relation in the Galactic disk: Is there a universal age–metallicity relation (AMR) in the Galactic disk (both "thin" and "thick" parts of the disk)? Although in the local (primarily thin) disk of the Milky Way there is no evidence of a strong AMR, a sample of 229 nearby "thick" disk stars has been used to investigate the existence of an age–metallicity relation in the Galactic thick disk, and indicate that there is an age–metallicity relation present in the thick disk. Stellar ages from asteroseismology confirm the lack of any strong age–metallicity relation in the Galactic disc.
- The lithium problem: Why is there a discrepancy between the amount of lithium-7 predicted to be produced in Big Bang nucleosynthesis and the amount observed in very old stars?
- Ultraluminous X-ray sources (ULXs): What powers X-ray sources that are not associated with active galactic nuclei but exceed the Eddington limit of a neutron star or stellar black hole? Are they due to intermediate-mass black holes? Some ULXs are periodic, suggesting non-isotropic emission from a neutron star. Does this apply to all ULXs? How could such a system form and remain stable?
- Fast radio bursts (FRBs): What causes these transient radio pulses from distant galaxies, lasting only a few milliseconds each? Why do some FRBs repeat at unpredictable intervals, but most do not? Dozens of models have been proposed, but none have been widely accepted.
- Origin of cosmic magnetic fields: Observations reveal that magnetic fields are present throughout the universe, from galaxies to galaxy clusters. However, the mechanisms that generated these large-scale cosmic magnetic fields remain unclear. Understanding their origin is a significant unsolved problem in astrophysics.

=== Nuclear physics ===
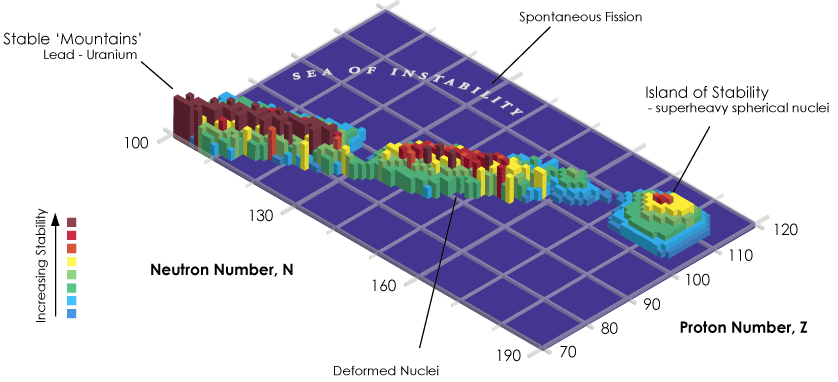
The "island of stability" in the proton vs. neutron number plot for heavy nuclei

- Quantum chromodynamics: What are the phases of strongly interacting matter, and what roles do they play in the evolution of the cosmos? What is the detailed partonic structure of the nucleons? What does QCD predict for the properties of strongly interacting matter? What determines the key features of QCD, and what is their relation to the nature of gravity and spacetime? Does QCD truly lack CP violations? (Strong CP problem)
- Quark–gluon plasma: Where is the onset of deconfinement: 1) as a function of temperature and chemical potentials? 2) as a function of relativistic heavy-ion collision energy and system size? What is the mechanism of energy and baryon-number stopping leading to creation of quark-gluon plasma in relativistic heavy-ion collisions? Why is sudden hadronization and the statistical-hadronization model a near-to-perfect description of hadron production from quark–gluon plasma? Is quark flavor conserved in quark–gluon plasma? Are strangeness and charm in chemical equilibrium in quark–gluon plasma? Does strangeness in quark–gluon plasma flow at the same speed as up and down quark flavours? Why does deconfined matter show ideal flow?
- Specific models of quark–gluon plasma formation: Do gluons saturate when their occupation number is large? Do gluons form a dense system called colour glass condensate? What are the signatures and evidences for the Balitsky–Fadin–Kuraev–Lipatov (BFKL), Balitsky–Kovchegov (BK), Catani–Ciafaloni–Fiorani–Marchesini (CCFM) evolution equations?
- Nuclei and nuclear astrophysics: What is the nature of the nuclear force that binds protons and neutrons into stable nuclei and rare isotopes? What is the explanation for the EMC effect? What is the nature of exotic excitations in nuclei at the frontiers of stability and their role in stellar processes? What is the nature of neutron stars and dense nuclear matter? What is the origin of the elements in the cosmos? What are the nuclear reactions that drive stars and stellar explosions? What is the heaviest possible chemical element?

=== Fluid dynamics ===
- Under what conditions do smooth solutions exist for the Navier–Stokes equations, which are the equations that describe the flow of a viscous fluid? This problem, for an incompressible fluid in three dimensions, is also one of the Millennium Prize Problems in mathematics.
- Turbulent flow: Is it possible to make a theoretical model to describe the statistics of a turbulent flow (in particular, its internal structures)?
- Granular convection: why does a granular material subjected to shaking or vibration exhibit circulation patterns similar to types of fluid convection? Why do the largest particles end up on the surface of a granular material containing a mixture of variously sized objects when subjected to a vibration/shaking?

=== Condensed matter physics ===
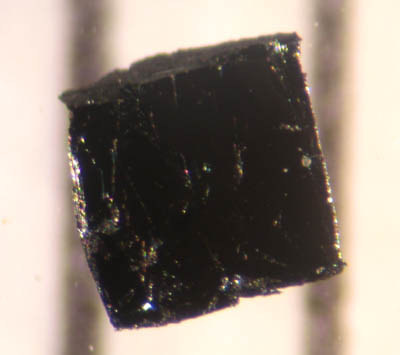
A sample of a cuprate superconductor (specifically BSCCO). The mechanism for superconductivity of these materials is unknown.

- High-temperature superconductivity: What is the mechanism that causes certain materials to exhibit superconductivity at temperatures much higher than around 25 kelvins? Is it possible to make a material that is a superconductor at room temperature and atmospheric pressure? What is the origin of the pseudogap in cuprates and other materials?
- Amorphous solids: What is the nature of the glass transition between a fluid or regular solid and a glassy phase? What are the physical processes giving rise to the general properties of glasses and the glass transition?
- Universality of low-temperature amorphous solids: why is the small dimensionless ratio of the phonon wavelength to its mean free path nearly the same for a very large family of disordered solids? This small ratio is observed for very large range of phonon frequencies.
- Cryogenic electron emission: Why does the electron emission in the absence of light increase as the temperature of a photomultiplier is decreased?
- Sonoluminescence: What causes the emission of short bursts of light from imploding bubbles in a liquid when excited by sound?
- Gauge block wringing: What mechanism allows gauge blocks to be wrung together?

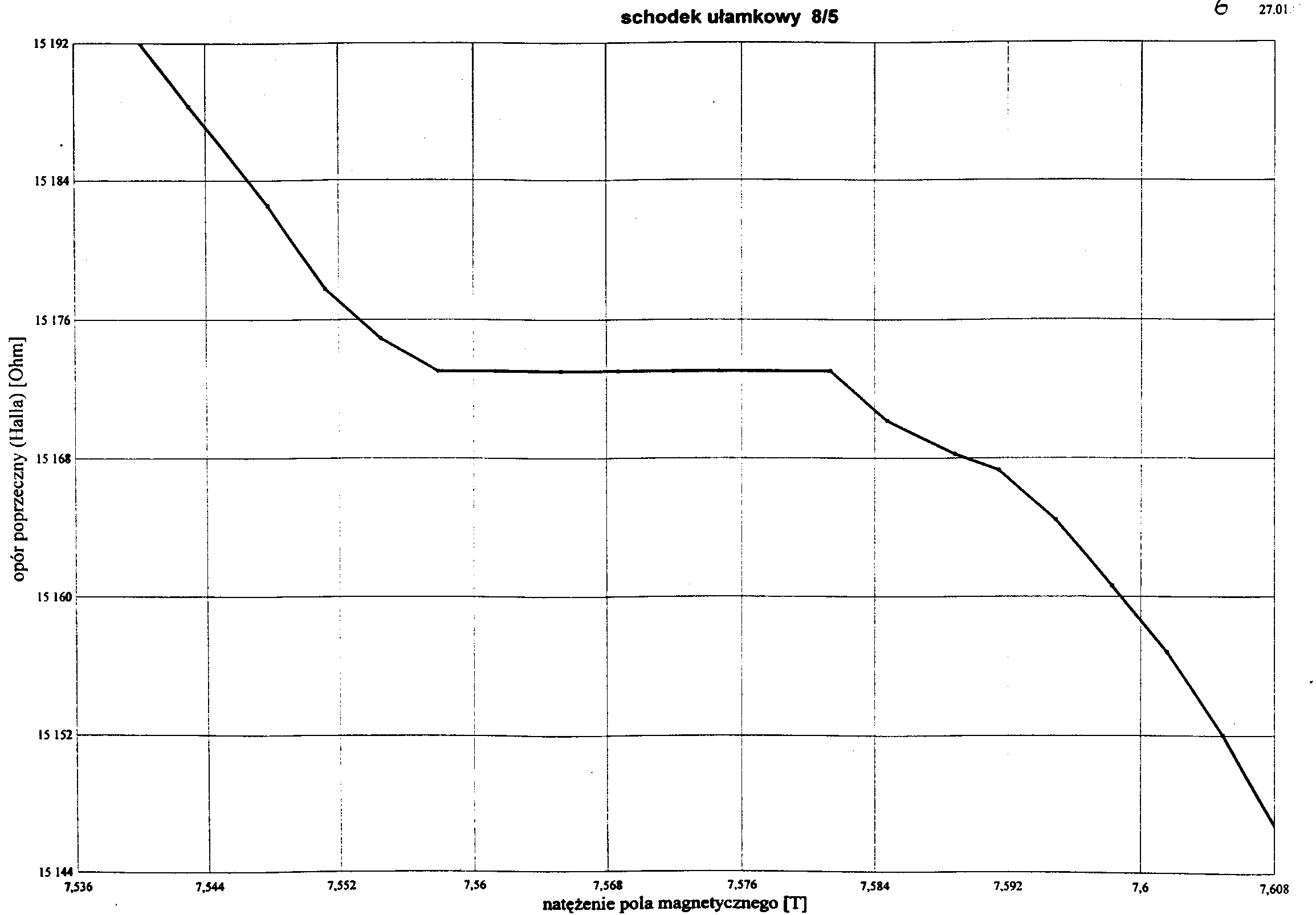
Magnetoresistance in a u = 8/5 fractional quantum Hall state

- Fractional Hall effect: What mechanism explains the existence of the u = 5/2 state in the fractional quantum Hall effect? Does it describe quasiparticles with non-Abelian fractional statistics?
- Liquid crystals: Can the nematic to smectic (A) phase transition in liquid crystal states be characterized as a universal phase transition?
- Semiconductor nanocrystals: What is the cause of the nonparabolicity of the energy-size dependence for the lowest optical absorption transition of quantum dots?
- Metal whiskering: In electrical devices, some metallic surfaces may spontaneously grow fine metallic whiskers, which can lead to equipment failures. While compressive mechanical stress is known to encourage whisker formation, the growth mechanism has yet to be determined.
- Superfluid transition in helium-4: Explain the discrepancy between the experimental and theoretical determinations of the heat capacity critical exponent α.
- Scharnhorst effect: Can light signals travel slightly faster than c between two closely spaced conducting plates, exploiting the Casimir effect?

=== Quantum computing and quantum information ===
- Threshold problem: Can we go beyond the noisy intermediate-scale quantum era? Can quantum computers reach fault tolerance? Is it possible to have enough qubit scalability to implement quantum error correction? What are the most promising candidate platforms to physically implement qubits?
- Topological qubits: Topological quantum computers are promising but can they be built? Can we demonstrate Majorana zero modes conclusively?
- Temperature: Can quantum computing be performed at non-cryogenic temperatures? Can we build room temperature quantum computers?
- Complexity classes problems: What is the relation between BQP and BPP? What is the relation between BQP and NP? Can computation in plausible physical theories (quantum algorithms) go beyond BQP?
- Post-quantum cryptography: Can we prove that some cryptographic protocols are safe against quantum computers?
- Quantum capacity: The capacity of a quantum channel is in general not known.

=== Plasma physics ===
- Plasma physics and fusion power: Fusion energy may potentially provide power from an abundant resource (e.g. hydrogen) without the type of radioactive waste that fission energy currently produces. However, can ionized gases (plasma) be confined long enough and at a high enough temperature to create fusion power? What is the physical origin of H-mode?
- The injection problem: Fermi acceleration is thought to be the primary mechanism that accelerates astrophysical particles to high energy. However, it is unclear what mechanism causes those particles to initially have energies high enough for Fermi acceleration to work on them.
- Alfvénic turbulence: In the solar wind and the turbulence in solar flares, coronal mass ejections, and magnetospheric substorms are major unsolved problems in space plasma physics.
- Ball lightning: the exact physical nature of this mystery in atmospheric electricity.
- Langmuir's paradox: In low-pressure plasmas, observed electron velocity distributions are often Maxwellian despite electron–electron collisions being too infrequent for thermalization.

=== Biophysics ===
- Abiogenesis: can life be created from physical processes alone?
- Stochasticity and robustness to noise in gene expression: How do genes govern our body, withstanding different external pressures and internal stochasticity? Certain models exist for genetic processes, but we are far from understanding the whole picture, in particular in development where gene expression must be tightly regulated.
- Quantitative study of the immune system: What are the quantitative properties of immune responses? What are the basic building blocks of immune system networks?
- Homochirality: What is the origin of the preponderance of specific enantiomers in biochemical systems?
- Magnetoreception: How do animals (e.g. migratory birds) sense the Earth's magnetic field?
- Protein structure prediction: How is the three-dimensional structure of proteins determined by the one-dimensional amino acid sequence? How can proteins fold on microsecond to second timescales when the number of possible conformations is astronomical and conformational transitions occur on the picosecond to microsecond timescale? Do the native structures of most naturally occurring proteins coincide with the global minimum of the free energy in conformational space? Or are most native conformations thermodynamically unstable, but kinetically trapped in metastable states? What keeps the high density of proteins present inside cells from precipitating?
- Quantum biology: Can coherence be maintained in biological systems at timeframes long enough to be functionally important? Are there non-trivial aspects of biology or biochemistry that can only be explained by the persistence of coherence as a mechanism?
- Physical understanding of biology: can biology be written in terms of fundamental laws? Can fundamental action principles and symmetries be used to understand biological concepts like robustness, modularity, evolvability and variability? Quantum and statistical field theory have been useful in virus evolution, can these techniques be developed to study larger organisms?

=== Foundations of physics ===
- Interpretation of quantum mechanics: How does the quantum description of reality, which includes elements such as the superposition of states and wavefunction collapse or quantum decoherence, give rise to the reality we perceive? Another way of stating this question regards the measurement problem: What constitutes a "measurement" which apparently causes the wave function to collapse into a definite state? Unlike classical physical processes, some quantum mechanical processes (such as quantum teleportation arising from quantum entanglement) cannot be simultaneously "local", "causal", and "real", but it is not obvious which of these properties must be sacrificed, or if an attempt to describe quantum mechanical processes in these senses is a category error such that a proper understanding of quantum mechanics would render the question meaningless.
- Arrow of time (e.g. entropy's arrow of time): Why does time have a direction? Why did the universe have such low entropy in the past, and time correlates with the universal (but not local) increase in entropy, from the past and to the future, according to the second law of thermodynamics? Why are CP violations observed in certain weak force decays, but not elsewhere? Are CP violations somehow a product of the second law of thermodynamics, or are they a separate arrow of time? Are there exceptions to the principle of causality? Is there a single possible past? Is the present moment physically distinct from the past and future, or is it merely an emergent property of consciousness? What links the quantum arrow of time to the thermodynamic arrow?
- Locality: Are there non-local phenomena in quantum physics? If they exist, are non-local phenomena limited to the entanglement revealed in the violations of the Bell inequalities, or can information and conserved quantities also move in a non-local way? Under what circumstances are non-local phenomena observed? What does the existence or absence of non-local phenomena imply about the fundamental structure of spacetime? How does this elucidate the proper interpretation of the fundamental nature of quantum physics?
- Quantum mind: Do quantum mechanical phenomena, such as entanglement and superposition, play an important part in the brain's function and can it explain critical aspects of consciousness?
- Geometric Langlands and physics: can the Langlands program related to representation theory explain the symmetries of physics, and viceversa?

== Problems solved in the past 30 years ==
=== General physics/quantum physics ===
- Perform a loophole-free Bell test experiment (1970–2015): In October 2015, scientists from the Kavli Institute of Nanoscience reported that the failure of the local hidden-variable hypothesis is supported at the 96% confidence level based on a "loophole-free Bell test" study. These results were confirmed by two studies with statistical significance over 5 standard deviations which were published in December 2015.

=== Cosmology and general relativity ===
- Existence of gravitational waves (1916–2016): On 11 February 2016, the Advanced LIGO team announced that they had directly detected gravitational waves from a pair of black holes merging, which was also the first detection of a stellar binary black hole.
- Numerical solution for binary black hole (1960s–2005): The numerical solution of the two body problem in general relativity was achieved after four decades of research. Three groups devised the breakthrough techniques in 2005 (annus mirabilis of numerical relativity).
- Cosmic age problem (1920s–1990s): The estimated age of the universe was around 3 to 8 billion years younger than estimates of the ages of the oldest stars in the Milky Way. Better estimates for the distances to the stars, and the recognition of the accelerating expansion of the universe, reconciled the age estimates.

=== High-energy physics/particle physics ===
- Existence of pentaquarks (1964–2015): In July 2015, the LHCb collaboration at CERN identified pentaquarks in the Λ^{0}_{b}→J/ψK^{−}p channel, which represents the decay of the bottom lambda baryon (Λ^{0}_{b}) into a J/ψ meson (J/ψ), a kaon (K^{−}) and a proton (p). The results showed that sometimes, instead of decaying directly into mesons and baryons, the Λ^{0}_{b} decayed via intermediate pentaquark states. The two states, named P^{+}_{c}(4380) and P^{+}_{c}(4450), had individual statistical significances of 9 σ and 12 σ, respectively, and a combined significance of 15 σ—enough to claim a formal discovery. The two pentaquark states were both observed decaying strongly to J/ψp, hence must have a valence quark content of two up quarks, a down quark, a charm quark, and an anti-charm quark (uudcc̅), making them charmonium-pentaquarks.
- Existence of quark-gluon plasma, a new phase of matter was discovered and confirmed in experiments at CERN-SPS (2000), BNL-RHIC (2005) and CERN-LHC (2010).
- Higgs boson and electroweak symmetry breaking (1963–2012): The mechanism responsible for breaking the electroweak gauge symmetry, giving mass to the W and Z bosons, was solved with the discovery of the Higgs boson of the Standard Model, with the expected couplings to the weak bosons. No evidence of a strong dynamics solution, as proposed by technicolor, has been observed.
- Origin of mass of most elementary particles: Solved with the discovery of the Higgs boson, which implies the existence of the Higgs field giving mass to these particles.
- Proton radius puzzle: A 2010 measurement of the charge radius for the proton found a significantly smaller value than past measurements. Measurements since 2019 supported the smaller value of 0.8409(4) fm. A 2022 reanalysis of old data with a revised theoretical model also supported the smaller value.

=== Astronomy and astrophysics ===
- Origin of short gamma-ray burst (1993–2017): From binary neutron stars merger, produce a kilonova explosion and short gamma-ray burst GRB 170817A was detected in both electromagnetic waves and gravitational wave GW170817.
- Missing baryon problem (1998–2017): proclaimed solved in October 2017, with the missing baryons located in hot intergalactic gas.
- Long-duration gamma-ray bursts (1993–2003): Long-duration bursts are associated with the deaths of massive stars in a specific kind of supernova-like event commonly referred to as a collapsar. However, there are also long-duration GRBs that show evidence against an associated supernova, such as the Swift event GRB 060614.
- Solar neutrino problem (1968–2001): Solved by a new understanding of neutrino physics, requiring a modification of the Standard Model of particle physics—specifically, neutrino oscillation.
- Solar abundance problem (1998–2022): A discrepancy between solar metallicity estimates from astronomical spectroscopy and helioseismology was resolved with updated measurements of the solar metallicity from the former.
- A discrepancy in measurements of Saturn's core spin between Voyager 2 and Cassini–Huygens data was resolved in 2015 with determination from its gravitational field.

=== Condensed matter physics ===
- Stability of topological order in three dimensions (2001–2026): Kitaev's surface code, the paradigmatic example of a topologically ordered phase of matter, was shown in 2001 to be a self-correcting quantum memory in four dimensions, while the two-dimensional version of this model becomes topologically trivial at any non-zero temperature. The question of whether or not self-correcting a quantum memory can exist in three dimensions remained a long-standing open problem until May 2026, when Balasubramanian et al. gave an explicit construction of a code featuring a memory time that increases (stretched-)exponentially with the size of the system.

=== Rapidly solved problems ===
- Existence of time crystals (2012–2016): The idea of a quantized time crystal was first theorized in 2012 by Frank Wilczek. In 2016, Khemani et al. and Else et al. independently of each other suggested that periodically driven quantum spin systems could show similar behaviour. Also in 2016, Norman Yao at Berkeley and colleagues proposed a different way to create discrete time crystals in spin systems. This was then used by two teams, a group led by Christopher Monroe at the University of Maryland and a group led by Mikhail Lukin at Harvard University, who were both able to show evidence for time crystals in the laboratory setting, showing that for short times the systems exhibited the dynamics similar to the predicted one.
- Photon underproduction crisis (2014–2015): This problem was resolved by Khaire and Srianand. They show that a factor 2 to 5 times large metagalactic photoionization rate can be easily obtained using updated quasar and galaxy observations. Recent observations of quasars indicate that the quasar contribution to ultraviolet photons is a factor of 2 larger than previous estimates. The revised galaxy contribution is a factor of 3 larger. These together solve the crisis.
- Hipparcos anomaly (1997–2012): The High Precision Parallax Collecting Satellite (Hipparcos) measured the parallax of the Pleiades and determined a distance of 385 light years. This was significantly different from other measurements made by means of actual to apparent brightness measurement or absolute magnitude. The anomaly was due to the use of a weighted mean when there is a correlation between distances and distance errors for stars in clusters. It is resolved by using an unweighted mean. There is no systematic bias in the Hipparcos data when it comes to star clusters.
- Faster-than-light neutrino anomaly (2011–2012): In 2011, the OPERA experiment mistakenly observed neutrinos appearing to travel faster than light. On 12 July 2012 OPERA updated their paper after discovering an error in their previous flight time measurement. They found agreement of neutrino speed with the speed of light.
- Pioneer anomaly (1980–2012): There was a deviation in the predicted accelerations of the Pioneer 10 and 11 spacecraft as they left the Solar System. It is believed that this is a result of previously unaccounted-for thermal recoil force.

== See also ==
- Lists of unsolved problems
- Physical paradox
- List of unsolved problems in astronomy
- List of unsolved problems in mathematics
