= Strangeness and quark–gluon plasma =

Subatomic signature

In high-energy nuclear physics, strangeness production in relativistic heavy-ion collisions is a signature and diagnostic tool of quark–gluon plasma (QGP) formation and properties. Unlike up and down quarks, from which everyday matter is made, heavier quark flavors such as strange and charm typically approach chemical equilibrium in a dynamic evolution process. QGP (also known as quark matter) is an interacting localized assembly of quarks and gluons at thermal (kinetic) and not necessarily chemical (abundance) equilibrium. The word plasma signals that color charged particles (quarks and/or gluons) are able to move in the volume occupied by the plasma. The abundance of strange quarks is formed in pair-production processes in collisions between constituents of the plasma, creating the chemical abundance equilibrium. The dominant mechanism of production involves gluons only present when matter has become a quark–gluon plasma. When quark–gluon plasma disassembles into hadrons in a breakup process, the high availability of strange antiquarks helps to produce antimatter containing multiple strange quarks, which is otherwise rarely made. Similar considerations are at present made for the heavier charm flavor, which is made at the beginning of the collision process in the first interactions and is only abundant in the high-energy environments of CERN's Large Hadron Collider.

== Quark–gluon plasma in the early universe and in the laboratory ==
Collision between two highly-energetic nuclei create an extremely dense environment, in which quarks and gluons may interact as free particles for brief moments. The collisions happened at such extreme velocities that the nuclei are "pancaked" because of Lorentz contraction.

Free quarks probably existed in the extreme conditions of the very early universe until about 30 microseconds after the Big Bang, in a very hot gas of free quarks, antiquarks and gluons. This gas is called quark–gluon plasma (QGP), since the quark-interaction charge (color charge) is mobile and quarks and gluons move around. This is possible because at a high temperature the early universe is in a different vacuum state, in which normal matter cannot exist but quarks and gluons can; they are deconfined (able to exist independently as separate unbound particles). In order to recreate this deconfined phase of matter in the laboratory it is necessary to exceed a minimum temperature, or its equivalent, a minimum energy density. Scientists achieve this using particle collisions at extremely high speeds, where the energy released in the collision can raise the subatomic particles' energies to an exceedingly high level, sufficient for them to briefly form a tiny amount of quark–gluon plasma that can be studied in laboratory experiments for little more than the time light needs to cross the QGP fireball, thus about 10^{−22} s. After this brief time the hot drop of quark plasma evaporates in a process called hadronization. This is so since practically all QGP components flow out at relativistic speed. In this way, it is possible to study conditions akin to those in the early Universe at the age of 10–40 microseconds.

Discovery of this new QGP state of matter has been announced both at CERN and at Brookhaven National Laboratory (BNL). Preparatory work, allowing for these discoveries, was carried out at the Joint Institute for Nuclear Research (JINR) and Lawrence Berkeley National Laboratory (LBNL) at the Bevalac. New experimental facilities, FAIR at the GSI Helmholtz Centre for Heavy Ion Research (GSI) and NICA at JINR, are under construction. Strangeness as a signature of QGP was first explored in 1983. Comprehensive experimental evidence about its properties is being assembled. Recent work by the ALICE collaboration at CERN has opened a new path to study of QGP and strangeness production in very high energy pp collisions.

== Strangeness in quark–gluon plasma ==
The diagnosis and the study of the properties of quark–gluon plasma can be undertaken using quarks not present in matter seen around us. The experimental and theoretical work relies on the idea of strangeness enhancement. This was the first observable of quark–gluon plasma proposed in 1980 by Johann Rafelski and Rolf Hagedorn. Unlike the up and down quarks, strange quarks are not brought into the reaction by the colliding nuclei. Therefore, any strange quarks or antiquarks observed in experiments have been "freshly" made from the kinetic energy of colliding nuclei, with gluons being the catalyst. Conveniently, the mass of strange quarks and antiquarks is equivalent to the temperature or energy at which protons, neutrons and other hadrons dissolve into quarks. This means that the abundance of strange quarks is sensitive to the conditions, structure and dynamics of the deconfined matter phase, and if their number is large it can be assumed that deconfinement conditions were reached. An even stronger signature of strangeness enhancement is the highly enhanced production of strange antibaryons. An early comprehensive review of strangeness as a signature of QGP was presented by Koch, Müller and Rafelski, which was recently updated. The abundance of produced strange anti-baryons, and in particular anti-omega $\bar{\Omega}(\bar{s}\bar{s}\bar{s})$, allowed to distinguish fully deconfined large QGP domain from transient collective quark models such as the color rope model proposed by Biró, Nielsen and Knoll. The relative abundance of $\phi (s\bar{s})/\bar{\Xi}(\bar{q}\bar{s}\bar{s})$ resolves questions raised by the canonical model of strangeness enhancement.

== Equilibrium of strangeness in quark–gluon plasma ==
One cannot assume that under all conditions the yield of strange quarks is in thermal equilibrium. In general, the quark-flavor composition of the plasma varies during its ultra short lifetime as new flavors of quarks such as strangeness are cooked up inside. The up and down quarks from which normal matter is made are easily produced as quark–antiquark pairs in the hot fireball because they have small masses. On the other hand, the next lightest quark flavor—strange quarks—will reach its high quark–gluon plasma thermal abundance provided that there is enough time and that the temperature is high enough. This work elaborated the kinetic theory of strangeness production proposed by T. Biro and J. Zimanyi who demonstrated that strange quarks could not be produced fast enough alone by quark-antiquark reactions. A new mechanism operational alone in QGP was proposed.

== Gluon fusion into strangeness ==
Feynman diagrams for the lowest order in strong coupling constant $\alpha_{s}$ strangeness production processes: gluon fusion, top, dominate the light quark based production.

Yield equilibration of strangeness yield in QGP is only possible due to a new process, gluon fusion, as shown by Rafelski and Müller. The top section of the Feynman diagrams figure, shows the new gluon fusion processes: gluons are the wavy lines; strange quarks are the solid lines; time runs from left to right. The bottom section is the process where the heavier quark pair arises from the lighter pair of quarks shown as dashed lines. The gluon fusion process occurs almost ten times faster than the quark-based strangeness process, and allows achievement of the high thermal yield where the quark based process would fail to do so during the duration of the "micro-bang".

The ratio of newly produced $\bar{s}s$ pairs with the normalized light quark pairs $\bar{u}u+\bar{d}d/2$—the Wroblewski ratio—is considered a measure of efficacy of strangeness production. This ratio more than doubles in heavy ion collisions, providing a model independent confirmation of a new mechanism of strangeness production operating in collisions that are producing QGP.

Regarding charm and bottom flavour: the gluon collisions here are occurring within the thermal matter phase and thus are different from the high energy processes that can ensue in the early stages of the collisions when the nuclei crash into each other. The heavier, charm and bottom quarks are produced there dominantly. The study in relativistic nuclear (heavy ion) collisions of charmed and soon also bottom hadronic particle production—beside strangeness—will provide complementary and important confirmation of the mechanisms of formation, evolution and hadronization of quark–gluon plasma in the laboratory.

== Strangeness (and charm) hadronization ==
Illustration of the two step process of strange antibaryon production, a key signature of QGP: strangeness is produced inside the fireball and later on in an independent process at hadronization several (anti)strange quarks form (anti)baryons. The production of triple strange $\Omega$ and $\bar{\Omega}$ is the strongest signature to date of QGP formation.

These newly cooked strange quarks find their way into a multitude of different final particles that emerge as the hot quark–gluon plasma fireball breaks up, see the scheme of different processes in figure. Given the ready supply of antiquarks in the "fireball", one also finds a multitude of antimatter particles containing more than one strange quark. On the other hand, in a system involving a cascade of nucleon–nucleon collisions, multi-strange antimatter are produced less frequently considering that several relatively improbable events must occur in the same collision process. For this reason one expects that the yield of multi-strange antimatter particles produced in the presence of quark matter is enhanced compared to conventional series of reactions. Strange quarks also bind with the heavier charm and bottom quarks which also like to bind with each other. Thus, in the presence of a large number of these quarks, quite unusually abundant exotic particles can be produced; some of which have never been observed before. This should be the case in the forthcoming exploration at the new Large Hadron Collider at CERN of the particles that have charm and strange quarks, and even bottom quarks, as components.

== Strange hadron decay and observation ==
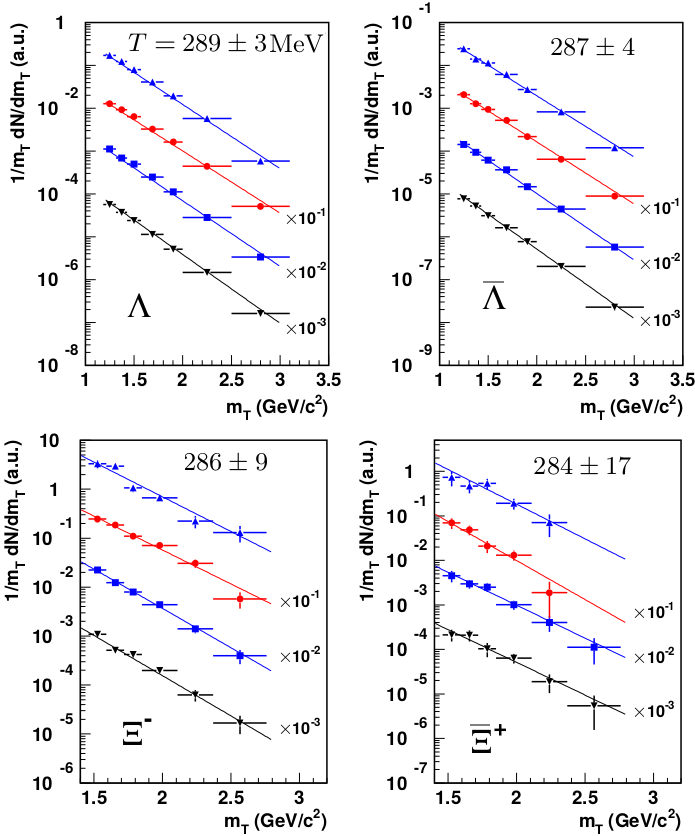
Universality of transverse mass spectra of strange baryons and antibaryons as measured by CERN-WA97 collaboration. Collisions at 158 A GeV. These results demonstrate that all these particles are produced in explosively hadronizing fireball (of QGP) and do not undergo further interaction once produced. This key result shows therefore formation a new state of matter announced at CERN in February 2000.

Strange quarks are naturally radioactive and decay by weak interactions into lighter quarks on a timescale that is extremely long compared with the nuclear-collision times. This makes it relatively easy to detect strange particles through the tracks left by their decay products. Consider as an example the decay of a negatively charged $\Xi$ baryon (green in figure, dss), into a negative pion (u̅d) and a neutral $\Lambda$ (uds) baryon. Subsequently, the $\Lambda$ decays into a proton and another negative pion. In general this is the signature of the decay of a $\Xi$. Although the negative $\Omega$ (sss) baryon has a similar final state decay topology, it can be clearly distinguished from the $\Xi$ because its decay products are different.

Measurement of abundant formation of $\Xi$ (uss/dss), $\Omega$ (sss) and especially their antiparticles is an important cornerstone of the claim that quark–gluon plasma has been formed. This abundant formation is often presented in comparison with the scaled expectation from normal proton–proton collisions; however, such a comparison is not a necessary step in view of the large absolute yields which defy conventional model expectations. The overall yield of strangeness is also larger than expected if the new form of matter has been achieved. However, considering that the light quarks are also produced in gluon fusion processes, one expects increased production of all hadrons. The study of the relative yields of strange and non strange particles provides information about the competition of these processes and thus the reaction mechanism of particle production.

== Systematics of strange matter and antimatter creation ==
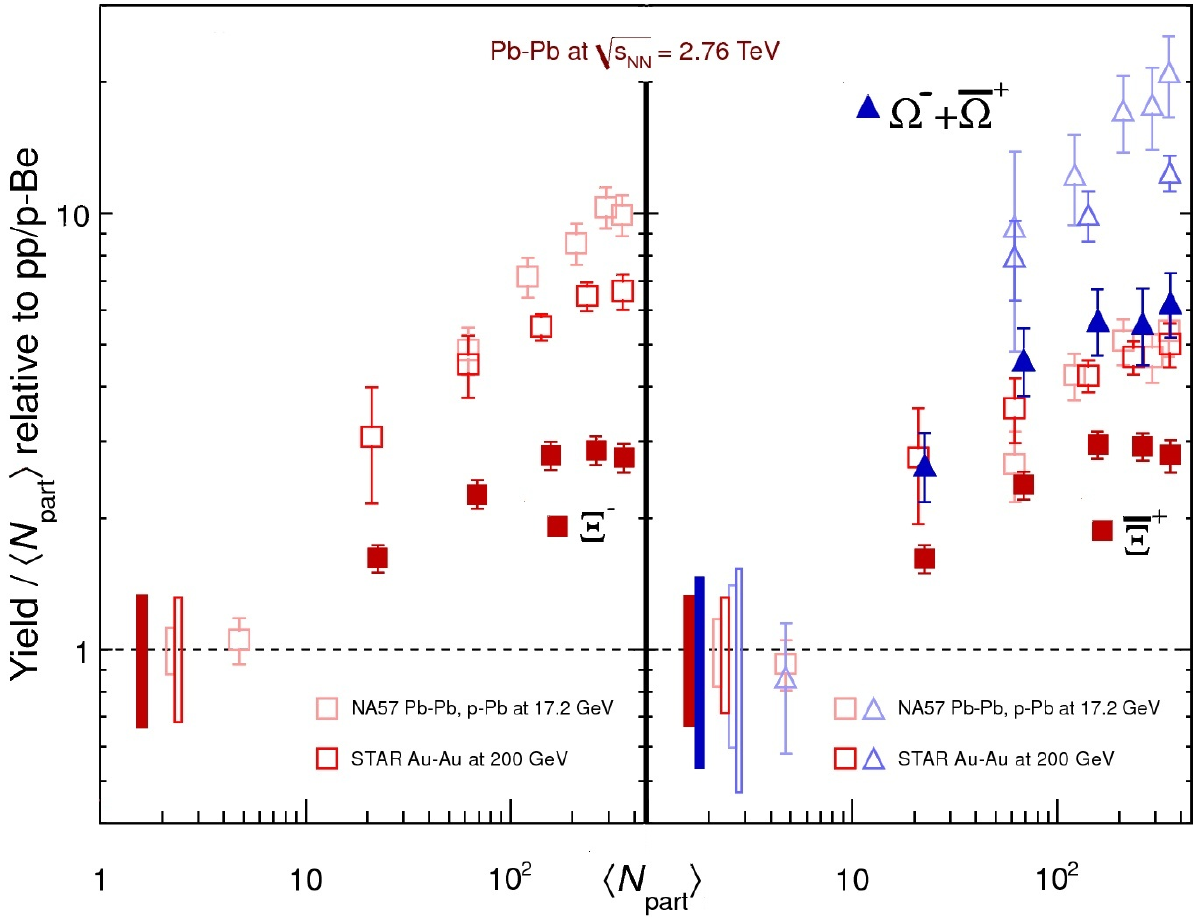
Enhancement of antibaryon yield increases with number of newly made quarks (s, anti-s, anti-q) and the size of the colliding system represented by the number of nucleons "damaged=wounded" in the collision of relativistic heavy ions. SPS, RHIC, and ALICE results shown as function of participating nucleons scaled—this represents residual enhancement after removal of scaling with number of participant.

The work of Koch, Muller, Rafelski predicts that in a quark–gluon plasma hadronization process the enhancement for each particle species increases with the strangeness content of the particle. The enhancements for particles carrying one, two and three strange or antistrange quarks were measured and this effect was demonstrated by the CERN WA97 experiment in time for the CERN announcement in 2000 of a possible quark–gluon plasma formation in its experiments. These results were elaborated by the successor collaboration NA57 as shown in the enhancement of antibaryon figure. The gradual rise of the enhancement as a function of the variable representing the amount of nuclear matter participating in the collisions, and thus as a function of the geometric centrality of nuclear collision strongly favors the quark–gluon plasma source over normal matter reactions.

A similar enhancement was obtained by the STAR experiment at the RHIC. Here results obtained when two colliding systems at 100 A GeV in each beam are considered: in red the heavier gold–gold collisions and in blue the smaller copper–copper collisions. The energy at RHIC is 11 times greater in the CM frame of reference compared to the earlier CERN work. The important result is that enhancement observed by STAR also increases with the number of participating nucleons. We further note that for the most peripheral events at the smallest number of participants, copper and gold systems show, at the same number of participants, the same enhancement as expected.

Another remarkable feature of these results, comparing CERN and STAR, is that the enhancement is of similar magnitude for the vastly different collision energies available in the reaction. This near energy independence of the enhancement also agrees with the quark–gluon plasma approach regarding the mechanism of production of these particles and confirms that a quark–gluon plasma is created over a wide range of collision energies, very probably once a minimal energy threshold is exceeded.

== ALICE: Resolution of remaining questions about strangeness as signature of quark–gluon plasma ==
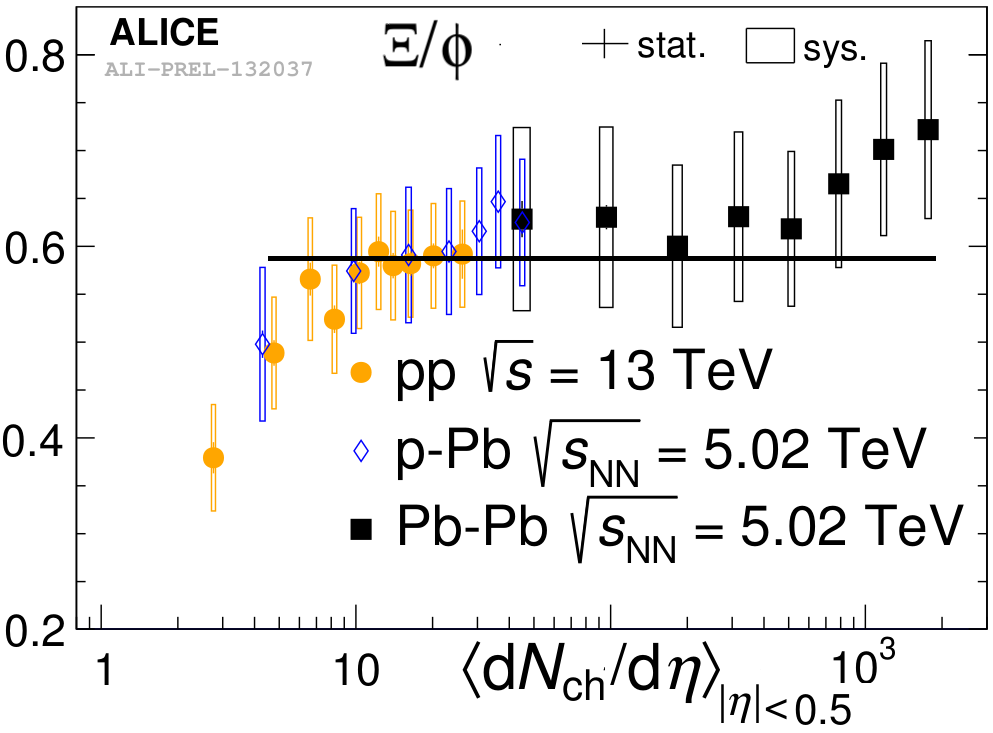
LHC-ALICE results for $(\bar{\Xi}+\Xi/\phi)$ obtained in three different collision systems at highest available energy as a function of charged hadron multiplicity produced.

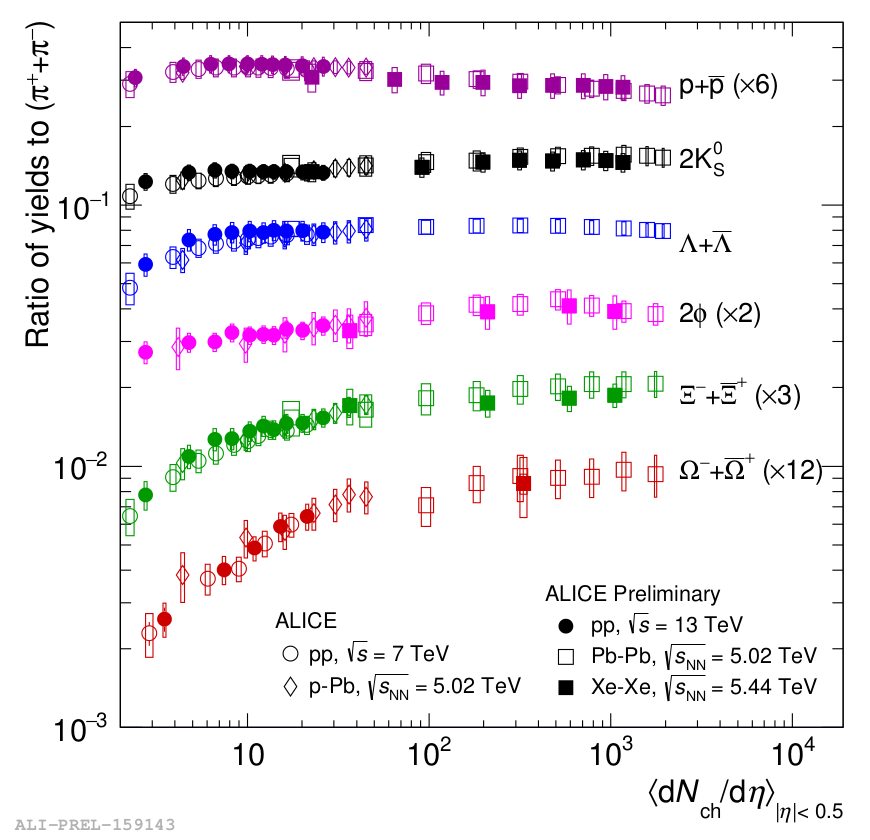
Ratio to pion of integrated yields for $p, K^0_s, \Lambda, \phi, \Xi$ and $\Omega$. The evolution with multiplicity at mid-rapidity, $\operatorname{d}\!N_{ch}/\operatorname{d}\!\eta_{<0.5}$, is reported for several systems and energies, including pp at $\sqrt{s}=7$ TeV, p-Pb at $\sqrt{s_{\operatorname{N}\!\operatorname{N}\!}}=5.02$ TeV, and also the ALICE preliminary results for pp at $\sqrt{s}=13$ TeV, Xe–Xe at $\sqrt{s_{\operatorname{N}\!\operatorname{N}\!}}=5.44$ TeV and Pb–Pb at $\sqrt{s_{\operatorname{N}\!\operatorname{N}\!}}=5.02$ TeV are included for comparison. Error bars show the statistical uncertainty, whereas the empty boxes show the total systematic uncertainty.

The very high precision of (strange) particle spectra and large transverse momentum coverage reported by the ALICE Collaboration at the Large Hadron Collider (LHC) allows in-depth exploration of lingering challenges, which always accompany new physics, and here in particular the questions surrounding strangeness signature. Among the most discussed challenges has been the question if the abundance of particles produced is enhanced or if the comparison base line is suppressed. Suppression is expected when an otherwise absent quantum number, such as strangeness, is rarely produced. This situation was recognized by Hagedorn in his early analysis of particle production and solved by Rafelski and Danos. In that work it was shown that even if just a few new pairs of strange particles were produced the effect disappears. However, the matter was revived by Hamieh et al. who argued that is possible that small sub-volumes in QGP are of relevance. This argument can be resolved by exploring specific sensitive experimental signatures for example the ratio of double strange particles of different type, such yield of $ssq$ ($\Xi$) compared to $\bar{s}s$($\phi$). The ALICE experiment obtained this ratio for several collision systems in a wide range of hadronization volumes as described by the total produced particle multiplicy. The results show that this ratio assumes the expected value for a large range volumes (two orders of magnitude). At small particle volume or multiplicity, the curve shows the expected reduction: The $ssq$ ($\Xi$) must be smaller compared to $\bar{s}s$($\phi$) as the number of produced strange pairs decreases and thus it easier to make $\bar{s}s$($\phi$) compared to $ssq$ ($\Xi$) that requires two pairs minimum to be made. However, we also see an increase at very high volume—this is an effect at the level of one to two standard deviations. Similar results were already recognized before by Petran et al.

Another highly praised ALICE result is the observation of same strangeness enhancement, not only on AA (nucleus–nucleus) but also in pA (proton–nucleus) and pp (proton–proton) collisions when the particle production yields are presented as a function of the multiplicity, which, as noted, corresponds to the available hadronization volume. ALICE results display a smooth volume dependence of total yield of all studied particles as function of volume, there is no additional "canonical" suppression. This is so since the yield of strange pairs in QGP is sufficiently high and tracks well the expected abundance increase as the volume and lifespan of QGP increases. This increase is incompatible with the hypothesis that for all reaction volumes QGP is always in chemical (yield) equilibrium of strangeness. Instead, this confirms the theoretical kinetic model proposed by Rafelski and Müller. The production of QGP in pp collisions was not expected by all, but should not be a surprise. The onset of deconfinement is naturally a function of both energy and collision system size. The fact that at extreme LHC energies we cross this boundary also in experiments with the smallest elementary collision systems, such as pp, confirms the unexpected strength of the processes leading to QGP formation. Onset of deconfinement in pp and other "small" system collisions remains an active research topic.

Beyond strangeness the great advantage offered by LHC energy range is the abundant production of charm and bottom flavor. When QGP is formed, these quarks are embedded in a high density of strangeness present. This should lead to copious production of exotic heavy particles, for example D_{s}. Other heavy flavor particles, some which have not even been discovered at this time, are also likely to appear.

== S–S and S–W collisions at SPS-CERN with projectile energy 200 GeV per nucleon on fixed target ==
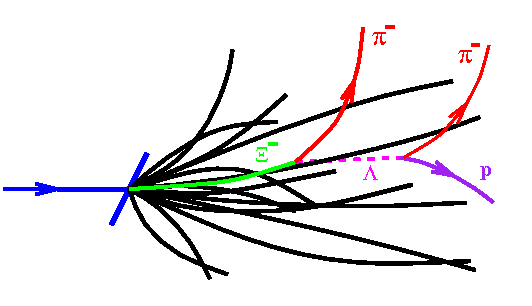
Illustration of self-analyzing strange hadron decay: a double strange $\Xi^{-}$ decays producing a $\pi^{-}$ and invisible $\Lambda$ which decays making a characteristic V-signature ($\pi^{-}$and p). This figure is created from actual picture taken at the NA35 CERN experiment. More details at page 28 in Letessier and Rafelski.

Quantitative comparison of $\bar{\Lambda}$ yield created in S–S with that in up-scaled p–p (squares) collision as a function of rapidity. Collisions at 200 A GeV.

Looking back to the beginning of the CERN heavy ion program one sees de facto announcements of quark–gluon plasma discoveries. The CERN-NA35 and CERN-WA85 experimental collaborations announced $\bar{\Lambda}$ formation in heavy ion reactions in May 1990 at the Quark Matter Conference, Menton, France. The data indicates a significant enhancement of the production of this antimatter particle comprising one antistrange quark as well as antiup and antidown quarks. All three constituents of the $\bar{\Lambda}$ particle are newly produced in the reaction. The WA85 results were in agreement with theoretical predictions. In the published report, WA85 interpreted their results as QGP. NA35 had large systematic errors in its data, which were improved in the following years. Moreover, the collaboration needed to evaluate the pp-background. These results are presented as function of the variable called rapidity which characterizes the speed of the source. The peak of emission indicates that the additionally formed antimatter particles do not originate from the colliding nuclei themselves, but from a source that moves at a speed corresponding to one-half of the rapidity of the incident nucleus that is a common center of momentum frame of reference source formed when both nuclei collide, that is, the hot quark–gluon plasma fireball.

== Horn in K → π ratio and the onset of deconfinement ==
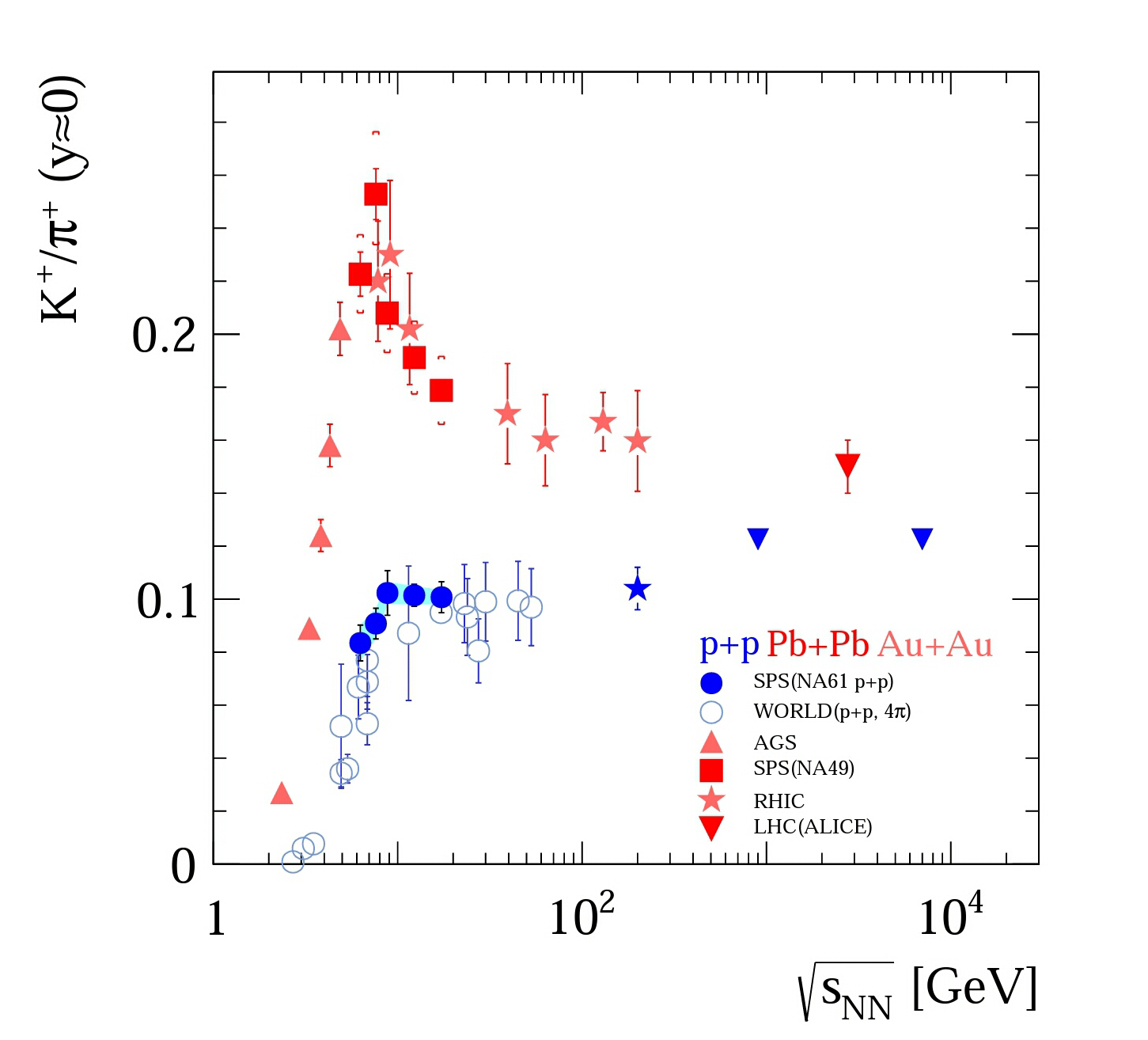
The ratio of mean multiplicities of positively charged kaons and pions as a function of collision energy in collisions of two lead nuclei and proton–proton interactions.

One of the most interesting questions is if there is a threshold in reaction energy and/or volume size which needs to be exceeded in order to form a domain in which quarks can move freely. It is natural to expect that if such a threshold exists the particle yields/ratios we have shown above should indicate that. One of the most accessible signatures would be the relative Kaon yield ratio. A possible structure has been predicted, and indeed, an unexpected structure is seen in the ratio of particles comprising the positive kaon K (comprising anti s-quarks and up-quark) and positive pion particles, seen in the figure (solid symbols). The rise and fall (square symbols) of the ratio has been reported by the CERN NA49. The reason the negative kaon particles do not show this "horn" feature is that the s-quarks prefer to hadronize bound in the Lambda particle, where the counterpart structure is observed. Data point from BNL–RHIC–STAR (red stars) in figure agree with the CERN data.

In view of these results the objective of ongoing NA61/SHINE experiment at CERN SPS and the proposed low energy run at BNL RHIC where in particular the STAR detector can search for the onset of production of quark–gluon plasma as a function of energy in the domain where the horn maximum is seen, in order to improve the understanding of these results, and to record the behavior of other related quark–gluon plasma observables.

== Outlook ==
The strangeness production and its diagnostic potential as a signature of quark–gluon plasma has been discussed for nearly 30 years. The theoretical work in this field today focuses on the interpretation of the overall particle production data and the derivation of the resulting properties of the bulk of quark–gluon plasma at the time of breakup. The global description of all produced particles can be attempted based on the picture of hadronizing hot drop of quark–gluon plasma or, alternatively, on the picture of confined and equilibrated hadron matter. In both cases one describes the data within the statistical thermal production model, but considerable differences in detail differentiate the nature of the source of these particles. The experimental groups working in the field also like to develop their own data analysis models and the outside observer sees many different analysis results. There are as many as 10–15 different particles species that follow the pattern predicted for the QGP as function of reaction energy, reaction centrality, and strangeness content. At yet higher LHC energies saturation of strangeness yield and binding to heavy flavor open new experimental opportunities.

== Conferences and meetings ==
Scientists studying strangeness as signature of quark gluon plasma present and discuss their results at specialized meetings. Well established is the series International Conference on Strangeness in Quark Matter, first organized in Tucson, Arizona, in 1995. The latest edition, 10–15 June 2019, of the conference was held in Bari, Italy, attracting about 300 participants. A more general venue is the Quark Matter conference, which last time took place from 3–9 September 2023 in Houston, USA, attracting about 800 participants.

== See also ==
- Quark–gluon plasma
- Quark matter
- Hadronization
- Strangelet
- Strange particle
