= NA61 experiment =

Particle physics experiment

NA61/SHINE experiment at CERN
- NA61 Experiment Logo
- Formation: Data taking started on 18-04-2008
- Headquarters: Geneva, Switzerland
- Spokespersons: Eric D. Zimmerman and Seweryn Kowalski
- Website: https://shine.web.cern.ch/

Super Proton Synchrotron (SPS)

Key SPS Experiments
- UA1: Underground Area 1
- UA2: Underground Area 2
- NA31: NA31 Experiment
- NA32: Investigation of Charm Production in Hadronic Interactions Using High-Resolution Silicon Detectors
- COMPASS: Common Muon and Proton Apparatus for Structure and Spectroscopy
- SHINE: SPS Heavy Ion and Neutrino Experiment
- NA62: NA62 Experiment

SPS preaccelerators
- p and Pb: Linear accelerators for protons (Linac 2) and Lead (Linac 3)
- (not marked): Proton Synchrotron Booster
- PS: Proton Synchrotron

NA61/SHINE (standing for "SPS Heavy Ion and Neutrino Experiment") is a particle physics experiment at the Super Proton Synchrotron (SPS) at the European Organization for Nuclear Research (CERN). The experiment studies the hadronic final states produced in interactions of various beam particles (pions, protons and beryllium, argon, and xenon nuclei) with a variety of fixed nuclear targets at the SPS energies.

About 135 physicists from 14 countries and 35 institutions work in NA61/SHINE. The experiment was initiated by Marek Gazdzicki, who later served as its spokesperson from 2007 to 2024. The primary motivation was to study the onset of deconfinement discovered by the NA49 experiment at the CERN SPS.

== Physics program ==
The NA61/SHINE physics program has been designed to measure hadron production in three different types of collisions:

- In nucleus–nucleus (heavy ion) collisions, in particular the measurement of fluctuations and long range correlations, with the aim to identify the properties of the onset of deconfinement and find evidence for the critical point of strongly interacting matter.
- In proton–proton and proton–nucleus interactions needed as reference data for better understanding of nucleus–nucleus reactions; in particular with regards to correlations, fluctuations and high transverse momenta.
- In hadron–nucleus interactions needed for neutrino (T2K, NOvA and future DUNE) and cosmic-ray experiments (Pierre Auger Observatory and KASCADE).

== Detector ==
The NA61/SHINE experiment uses a large acceptance hadron spectrometer located on the H2 beam line in the North Area of CERN. It consist of components used by the heavy ion NA49 experiment as well as those designed and constructed for NA61/SHINE.

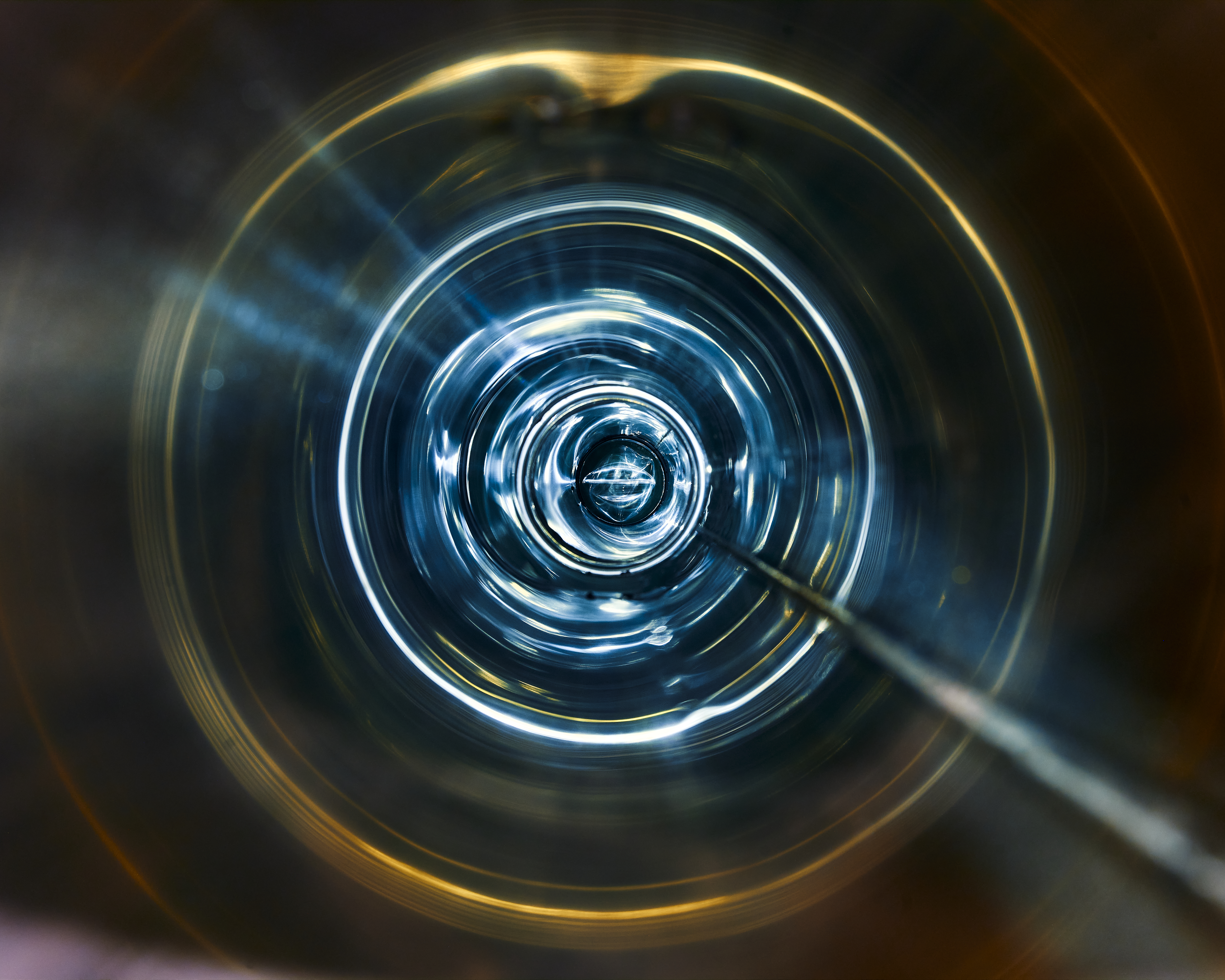
PSD detector for NA61

The main tracking devices are four large volume time projection chambers (TPCs), which are capable of detecting up to 70% of all charged particles created in the studied reactions. Two of them are located in the magnetic field of two super-conducting dipole magnets with maximum bending powers of 9 tesla meters. Two others are positioned downstream of the magnets symmetrically with respect to the beam line. Additionally, four small volume TPCs placed directly along the beamline region are used in case of hadron and light ion beams.

The setup is supplemented by time of flight detector walls, which extend particle identification to low momenta (1 GeV/c < p ). Furthermore, the Projectile Spectator Detector (a calorimeter) is positioned downstream of the time of flight detectors to measure energy of projectile fragments.

== Collected data ==
Type of interaction	Beam momentum $\left(\frac{GeV}{c}\right)$	Year	Citation
π + Be	120	2016	CERN-SPSC-2017-038
π + C	30, 60, 158, and 350	2009, 2012, 2016, and 2017	CERN-SPSC-2016-038, PR D100 112004, and PR D100 112001
π + Al	60	2017	CERN-SPSC-2016-038 and PR D98 052001
Kaon + C	158	2012	CERN-SPSC-2016-038 and MPL A34 1950078
p + p	13, 20, 31, 40, 80, 158, and 400	2009, 2010, 2011, and 2016	EPJ C80 460, SQM 2019 315, and EPJ C74 2794
p + Be	60, and 120	2016 and 2017	CERN-SPSC-2017-038, and PR D100 112001
p + C p + (T2K replica target) p + (NOvA replica target)	31, 60, 90, and 120	2007, 2009, 2010, 2012, 2016, 2017, and 2018	CERN-SPSC-2017-038, CERN-SPSC-2016-038, CERN-SPSC-2019-041, PR D100 112001 and EPJ C76 617
p + Al	60	2016	CERN-SPSC-2017-038 and NP B732 1
p + Pb	30, 40, 80 and 158	2012, 2014, 2016, and 2017	CERN-SPSC-2015-036
Be + Be	13A, 19A, 30A, 40A, 75A, and 150A	2011, 2012, and 2013	CERN-SPSC-2013-028, PoS 364 305, and EPJ C80 961
C + C and C + CH$_2$	13A	2018	CERN-SPSC-2019-041
Ar + Sc	13A, 19A, 30A, 40A, 75A and 150A	2015	CERN-SPSC-2015-036, PoS 364 305, Acta Phys. Pol. B Proc. Suppl. 10 645 and EPJ C81 397
Xe + La	13A, 19A, 30A, 40A, 75A, and 150A	2017	CERN-SPSC-2018-029 and PoS 364 305
Pb + Pb	13A, 30A, and 150A	2016 and 2018	CERN-SPSC-2016-038, J. Phys. Conf. Ser. 1690 012127 and PR C77 064908

== Extended program: after Long Shutdown 2 ==
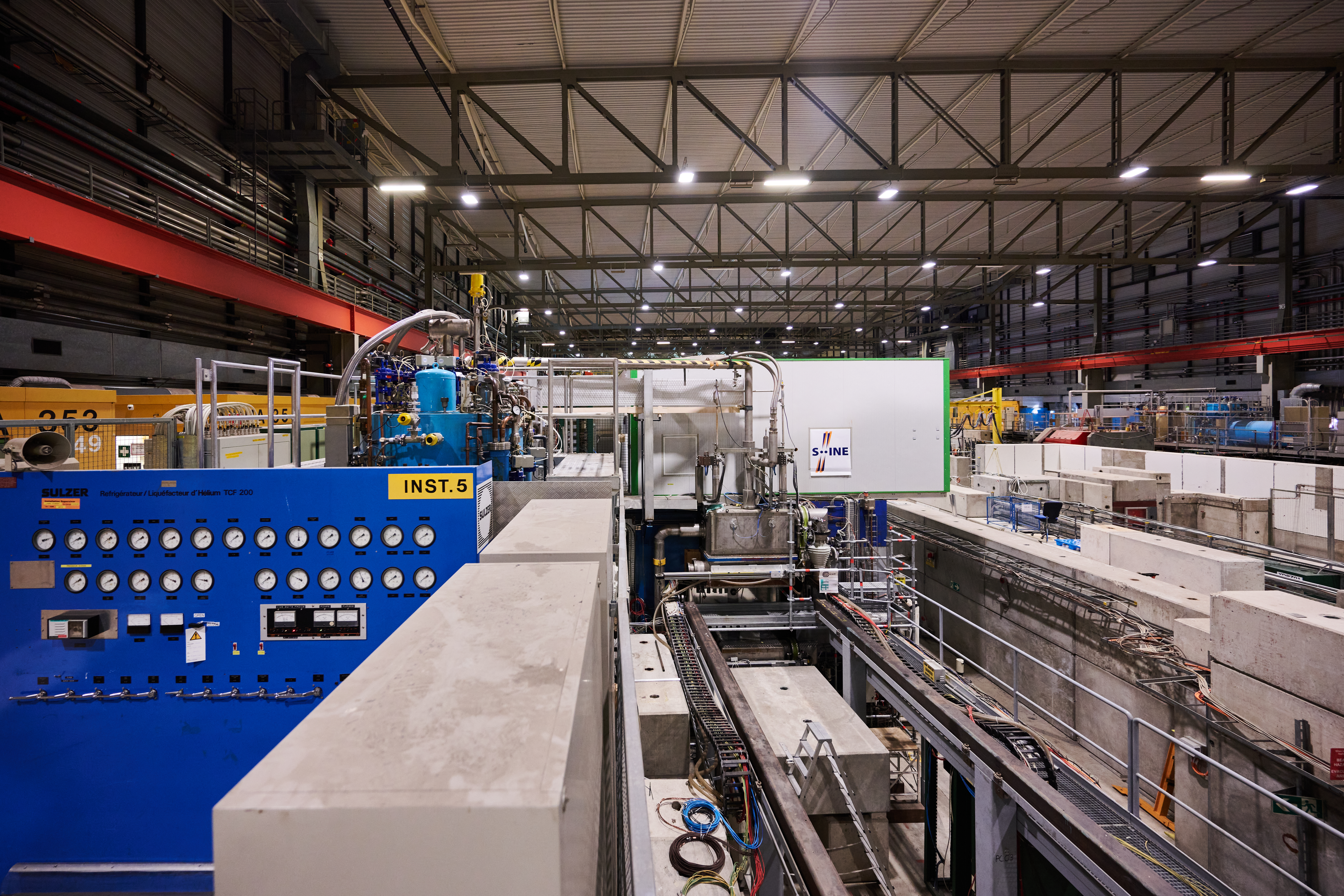
NA61 experiment at CERN after Long Shutdown 2

In 2018 the NA61/SHINE collaboration published an addendum presenting an intent to upgrade the experimental facility and perform a new set of measurements after Long Shutdown 2. As in the original program, the new one proposes studies of hadron-nucleus and nucleus-nucleus interactions for heavy ions, neutrino and cosmic-ray physics.

The heavy ions program will focus on study of charm hadron production (mostly D mesons) in lead-lead interactions.

In 2020 the SPS and PS Experiments Committee (SPSC) recommended approval of beam time in 2021. The Research Board endorsed these recommendations.

== See also ==
- List of Super Proton Synchrotron experiments
