= Elliptic flow =

Relativistic heavy-ion collisions produce very large numbers of subatomic particles in all directions. In such collisions, flow refers to how energy, momentum, and number of these particles varies with direction, and elliptic flow is a measure of how the flow is not uniform in all directions when viewed along the beam-line. Elliptic flow is strong evidence for the existence of quark–gluon plasma, and has been described as one of the most important observations measured at the Relativistic Heavy Ion Collider (RHIC).

Elliptic flow describes the azimuthal momentum space anisotropy of particle emission from non-central heavy-ion collisions in the plane transverse to the beam direction, and is defined as the second harmonic coefficient of the azimuthal Fourier decomposition of the momentum distribution. Elliptic flow is a fundamental observable since it directly reflects the initial spatial anisotropy, of the nuclear overlap region in the transverse plane, directly translated into the observed momentum distribution of identified particles. Since the spatial anisotropy is largest at the beginning of the evolution, elliptic flow is especially sensitive to the early stages of system evolution. A measurement of elliptic flow thus provides access to the fundamental thermalization time scale and many more things in the early stages of a relativistic heavy-ion collision.
