= Julia Velkovska =

Bulgarian-American high energy particle physicist

Julia Apostolova Velkovska
- Education: Sofia University; Stony Brook University
- Scientific career
- Workplaces: Brookhaven National Laboratory; Vanderbilt University
- Thesis: Quasi-fission reaction dynamics (1997)

Julia Apostolova Velkovska is a Bulgarian-American high energy particle physicist who is the Cornelius Vanderbilt Professor of Physics at Vanderbilt University. Her research considers nuclear matter in the extreme conditions generated at the Relativistic Heavy Ion Collider. She hopes that this work will help to explain the mechanisms that underpin the strong force.

== Early life and education ==
Velkovska was born in Bulgaria. She attended Sofia University, where she majored in physics. After earning her bachelor's degree in 1988, Velkovska joined Stony Brook University for her doctoral research. She remained at Stony Brook for a short postdoctoral position, before moving to Brookhaven National Laboratory as an assistant scientist.

== Research ==
Velkovska's research considers high-energy physics and nuclear matter. Velkovska uses the extreme conditions of the Relativistic Heavy Ion Collider to study the mechanisms that underpin the strong force. The strong force is responsible for confining the quarks and gluons in hadrons (e.g. protons and neutrons). At the RHIC, nuclei collide at speeds approaching the speed of light, which forces protons and neutrons to melt into a soup of gluons and quarks. She showed that in these extreme environments, matter exists in a novel phase, with an unexpected increase in the number of protons and anti-protons. The phase, the quark–gluon plasma, is expected to be the most hot and dense, and believed to have existed in the first microseconds of the universe. She has investigated how particles interact with the quark–gluon plasma as part of the Pioneering High Energy Nuclear Interaction eXperiment (PHENIX). She investigated the collisions of protons, deuterons and Helium-3 nuclei travelling at nearly the speed of light with gold nuclei. After the identification of the quark–gluon plasma, Velkovska worked on improving the detectors of the Relativistic Heavy Ion Collider. The most surprising result was that this quark-gluon plasma behaved like a highly coordinated liquid, not a gas. To see what happened at even higher energies, Velkovska studied the quark–gluon plasma at the Large Hadron Collider. Velkovska was at CERN, participating in the CMS experiment, when the discovery of the Higgs boson was announced.

In 2018, Velkovska showed that these collisions result in small droplets of almost perfect fluid, i.e. a cohesive liquid that flows at zero viscosity, that emerge in distinctive patterns, including ellipses and triangles. Specifically, she found a correlation between the geometry of the collision and the patterns created, providing evidence for the formation of the quark–gluon plasma irrespective of the environmental conditions. She has studied how these hydrodynamic flow patterns are impacted by the volume and time duration of the collision.

== Awards and honors ==
- 2004 Department of Energy Outstanding Junior Investigator
- 2007 Sloan Research Fellowship
- 2010 Kavli Frontiers of Science Fellow
- 2015 American Physical Society Fellow
- 2016 Vanderbilt University Chancellor's Award for Research
- 2019 Vanderbilt University Cornelius Vanderbilt Chair
- 2023 Vanderbilt University Physics and Astronomy Department Chair

== Selected publications ==
- S. S. Adler; S. Afanasiev; C. Aidala; et al. (29 March 2004). "Identified charged particle spectra and yields in Au+Au collisions at √(sNN )=200 GeV". Physical Review C. 69 (3). arXiv:nucl-ex/0307022. Bibcode:2004PhRvC..69c4909A. doi:10.1103/physrevc.69.034909. ISSN 2469-9985. Wikidata Q57516210.
- K. Adcox; S.S. Adler; S. Afanasiev; et al. (August 2005). "Formation of dense partonic matter in relativistic nucleus–nucleus collisions at RHIC: Experimental evaluation by the PHENIX Collaboration". Nuclear Physics A. 757 (1–2): 184–283. arXiv:nucl-ex/0410003. Bibcode:2005NuPhA.757..184A. doi:10.1016/j.nuclphysa.2005.03.086. ISSN 1873-1554. Wikidata Q56442207.
