= NA-35 =

NA-35 may refer to:

- NA-35 (Bannu), a constituency of the National Assembly of Pakistan
- North American NA-35, training aircraft designed by North American Aviation
- NA35 experiment, a particle physics experiment that took place at CERN between 1983 and 1999
- Sodium-35 (Na-35 or ^{35}Na), an isotope of sodium
