= Onset of deconfinement =

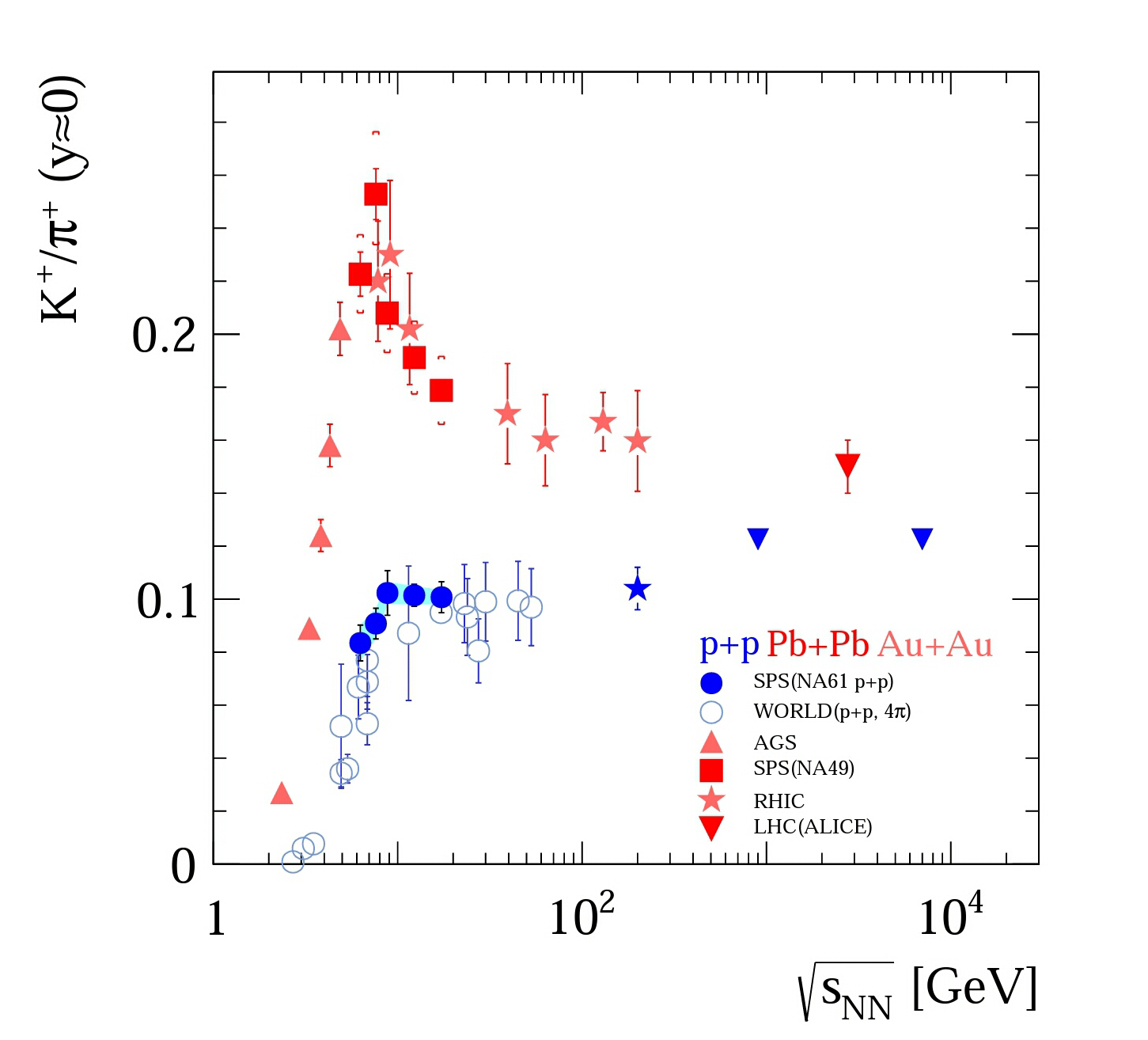
The ratio of mean multiplicities of positively charged kaons and pions as a function of collision energy in collisions of two lead nuclei and proton–proton interactions

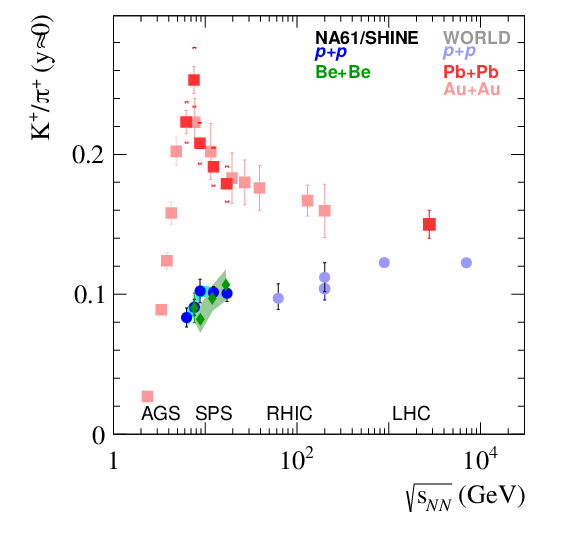
The energy dependence of the K+/π+ particle yields ratio at mid-rapidity (left) and full acceptance (right) for the 20% most central Be+Be, central Pb+Pb, and Au+Au collisions, as well as inelastic p+p interactions

The onset of deconfinement refers to the beginning of the creation of deconfined states of strongly interacting matter produced in nucleus-nucleus collisions with increasing collision energy (a quark–gluon plasma).

The onset of deconfinement was predicted by Marek Gazdzicki and Mark I. Gorenstein to be located in the low energy range of the Super Proton Synchrotron (SPS) at the European Organization for Nuclear Research (CERN). These predictions have been confirmed by the NA49 experiment at the CERN SPS within the energy scan programme. The most famous of these is the "horn" in the ratio of mean multiplicities of positively charged kaons and pions observed in collisions of two lead nuclei at the low energies of the SPS.

Strangeness production in relativistic heavy-ion collisions is used for the detection of the onset of deconfinement.
