= Color-glass condensate =

Hypothetical phase of matter

Color-glass condensate (CGC) is a type of matter theorized to exist in atomic nuclei when they collide at near the speed of light. During such collision, one is sensitive to the gluons that have very small momenta, or more precisely a very small $x_{Bj}$ Bjorken scaling variable. The small momenta gluons dominate the description of the collision because their density is very large. This is because a high-momentum gluon is likely to split into smaller momentum gluons. When the gluon density becomes large enough, gluon-gluon recombination puts a limit on how large the gluon density can be. When gluon recombination balances gluon splitting, the density of gluons saturates, producing new and universal properties of hadronic matter. This state of saturated gluon matter is called the color-glass condensate.

"Color" in the name "color-glass condensate" refers to a type of charge that quarks and gluons carry as a result of the strong nuclear force. The word "glass" is borrowed from the term for silica and other materials that are disordered and act like solids on short time scales but liquids on long time scales. In the CGC phase, the gluons themselves are disordered and do not change their positions rapidly. "Condensate" means that the gluons have a very high density.

The color-glass condensate describes an intrinsic property of matter that can only be observed under high-energy conditions such as those at RHIC, the Large Hadron Collider as well as the future Electron Ion Collider.

The color-glass condensate is important because it is proposed as a universal form of matter that describes the properties of all high-energy, strongly interacting particles. It has simple properties that follow from first principles in the theory of strong interactions, quantum chromodynamics. It has the potential to explain many unsolved problems such as how particles are produced in high-energy collisions, and the distribution of matter itself inside of these particles.

Researchers at CERN believe they have created color-glass condensates during collisions of protons with lead ions. In these sorts of collisions, the standard outcome is that new particles are created and fly off in different directions. However, the Compact Muon Solenoid (CMS) team at the LHC found that in a sample of 2 million lead-proton collisions, some pairs of particles flew away from each other with their respective directions correlated. This correlation of directions is the anomaly that might be caused by the existence of a color-glass condensate while the particles are colliding.

== Erroneous description in term of hadronic pancakes or gluonic wall ==
The high density of gluon seen during the collision is often explained by contraction of the nucleus. Accordingly, this one would appear compressed along its direction of motion and as a result, the gluons inside the nucleus would appear to a stationary observer as a "gluonic wall" traveling near the speed of light. At very high energies, the density of the gluons in this wall would then increase greatly. However, this description is incorrect for two reasons:

1. Such description depends on the frame and therefore violates Lorentz invariance: a fundamental description of the structure of an object cannot depend on a choice of frame. A classical analogy would be if one would provide a fundamental description using fictitious forces such as the Coriolis force.
2. contraction is not observable in collision experiments due to the Penrose–Terrell effect.

A correct description of the collision can be given using light-front wave functions, which are frame-independent.

== See also ==
- Glasma
