= NA49 experiment =

Particle physics experiment

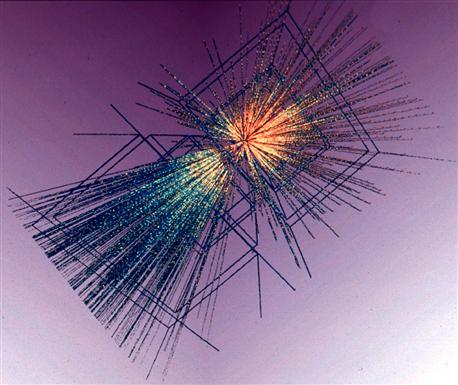
The image shows a bunch of hadrons emerging from the collision by breaking apart the ions. One of such collisions will eventually lead to the production of quark-gluon plasma.

The NA49 experiment ("North Area experiment 49") was a particle physics experiment that investigated the properties of quark–gluon plasma. The experiment's synonym was Ions/TPC-Hadrons. It took place in the North Area of the Super Proton Synchrotron (SPS) at CERN from 1991 to 2002.

The experiment used a large-acceptance hadron detector (a time projection chamber) to investigate reactions induced by the collision of various heavy ions (such as those of lead) on targets made of a variety of elements. The purpose of NA49 was to study the production of charged hadrons and neutral strange particles to search for the prediction of the deconfinement transition by the lattice QCD.

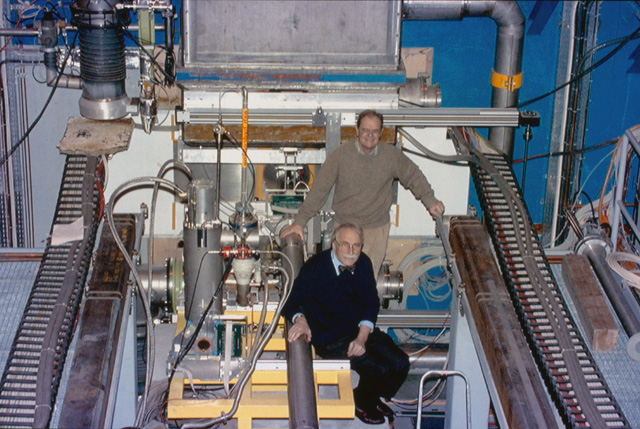
Reinhard Stock (front) and Peter Seyboth (back), the NA49 spokespersons in front of the NA49 detector at CERN.

The NA49 experiment was the follow-up to the NA35 experiment, and was approved on 18 September 1991. The experiment began taking data in November 1994 and was completed on 19 October 2002. It was succeeded by the NA61 experiment (SHINE). The spokespersons for the experiment are Peter Seyboth and Reinhard Stock.

== Background ==
According to the Standard Model (SM), quarks can only exists in combinations of two and three as hadrons, and a single quark cannot be alone in a vacuum. Quarks experience the strong interaction, mediated by gluon exchange, whereas hadrons experience the nuclear force, described by the complicated phenomenon of hadronic interaction. Quark Matter is the name given to the state at which quarks are deconfined from a hadron volume. Searching for Quark Matter tests the SM, in particular the strong interaction, which is predicted by the lattice gauge theory. Following the Big Bang, the Universe is supposed to have consisted of Quark Matter, and the investigation into this state could provide data for astrophysical studies.

Particle theory predicts that heating normal nuclear matter above a critical value (similarly with density also) will result in a deconfined quark-gluon matter. To produce this state, fixed target experiments are used. A thin metal foil target is bombarded with a beam of heavy nuclei accelerated close to the speed of light. Immediately after the collision, a hot and dense state of quark-gluon matter may be created, which will drive an explosive expansion. At this point the density and temperature decreases and hadrons are emitted from the matter, which can be detected by detectors.

== Experimental setup ==
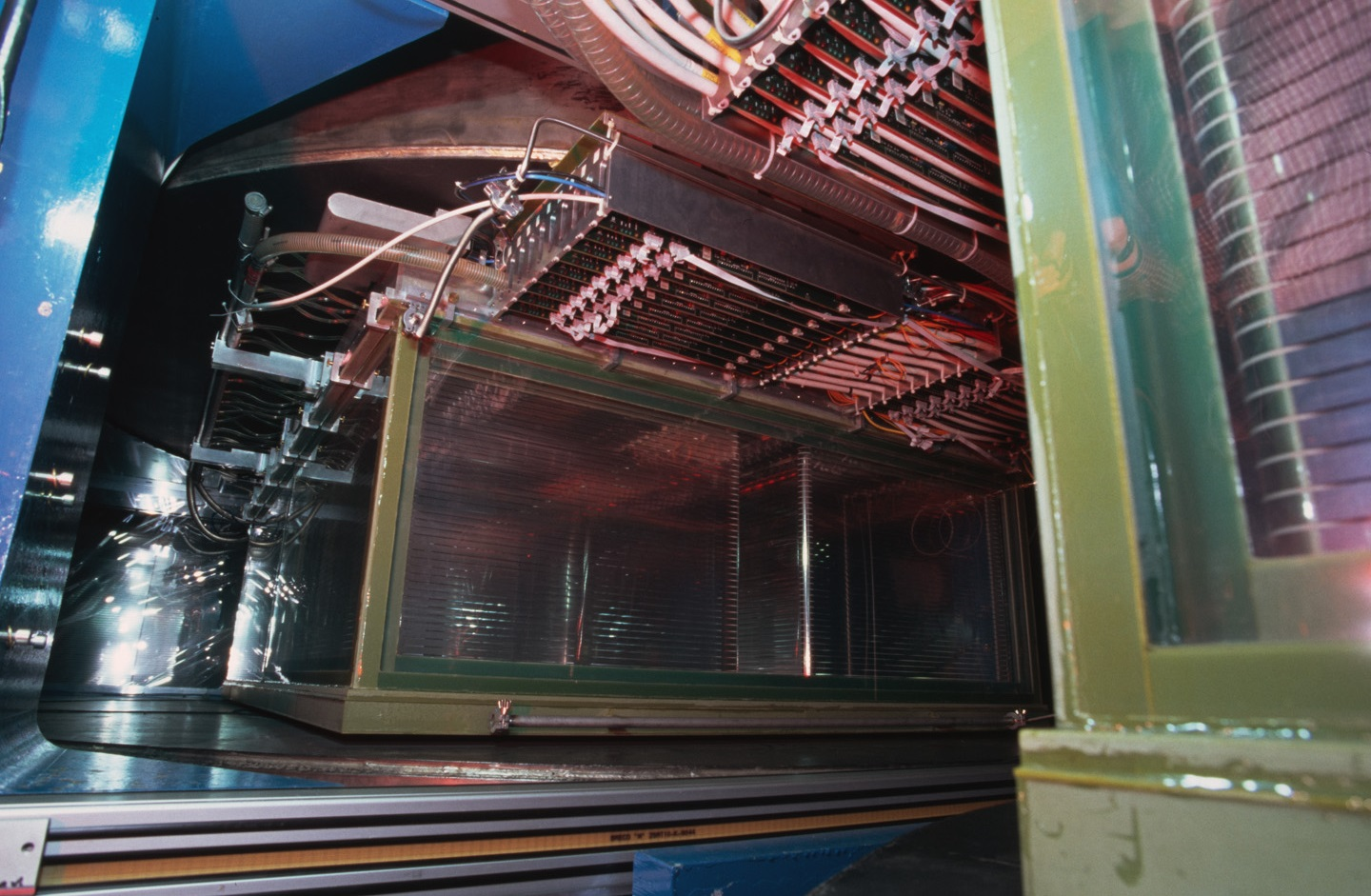
NA49 vertex time projection chamber 2 inside superconducting magnet

Four large-volume time projection chambers (TPC) were used for the NA49 experiment, for tracking and for particle identification. The first two TPCs were inside dipole magnets with superconducting coils, used to determine particle momentum from the bending of charged-particle trajectories. The other two TPCs were placed behind the magnets to deduce the ionisation energy loss (dE/dx) and particle velocity. The experiment also used an adapted large calorimeter from previous SPS experiments, which was able to measure the transverse energy of hadrons emitted from the collision. Time of flight (ToF) measurements were made by two scintillation counter walls, with a time resolution of 60 ps. Front end electronics were used to read out the TPCs.

The beam used was from the SPS and consisted of the isotope ^{208}Pb, a heavy, dense nuclear species, with an energy of 33 TeV. The target used in the experiment were thin lead foils, resulting in a Pb+Pb nuclear collision when the beam was directed at it.

== Results ==
The energy density created in the collisions of the NA49 experiment was determined to be larger than the critical value, and therefore high enough to probe into the quark-gluon matter. This was determined to be 3 GeV per cubic femtometre, which showed agreement with lattice QCD. Furthermore, the experiment was also able to determine a 'freeze-out' temperature of 120 MeV, the temperature at which collisions among the produced hadrons stop.

More results were used to determine the parton-hadron phase transition which agrees with the lattice QCD prediction. The results indicate that the nature of the phase transformation occurs with no large latent heat jump, which is subject to theoretical discussions.

== See also ==
- NA35 experiment
- NA61 experiment
- List of SPS experiments
