= Fracton =

Synonym of phonon

In physics, a fracton is a collective quantized vibration on a substrate with a fractal structure.

Fractons are the fractal analog of phonons. Phonons are the result of applying translational symmetry to the potential in a Schrödinger equation. Fractal self-similarity can be thought of as a symmetry somewhat comparable to translational symmetry. Translational symmetry is symmetry under displacement or change of position, and fractal self-similarity is symmetry under change of scale. The quantum mechanical solutions to such a problem in general lead to a continuum of states with different frequencies. In other words, a fracton band is comparable to a phonon band. The vibrational modes are restricted to part of the substrate and are thus not fully delocalized, unlike phonon vibrational modes. Instead, there is a hierarchy of vibrational modes that encompass smaller and smaller parts of the substrate.

== Literature ==
- Gromov, Andrey; Radzihovsky, Leo (5 January 2024). "Colloquium : Fracton matter". Reviews of Modern Physics. 96 (1). doi:10.1103/RevModPhys.96.011001.
