= NA35 experiment =

CERN Particle physics experiment

The NA35 experiment was a particle physics experiment that took place in the North Area of the Super Proton Synchrotron (SPS) at CERN. It used a streamer chamber with comprehensive hadronic and electromagnetic calorimetry. This experiment was used to observe the properties of nucleus-nucleus collisions at 60 and 200 GeV/nucleon, to understand the degree of stopping and thermalization, determine the energy densities achievable in those conditions, and to measure other related properties and quantities.

The first signature of quark–gluon plasma was observed by the NA35 experiment in 1995.

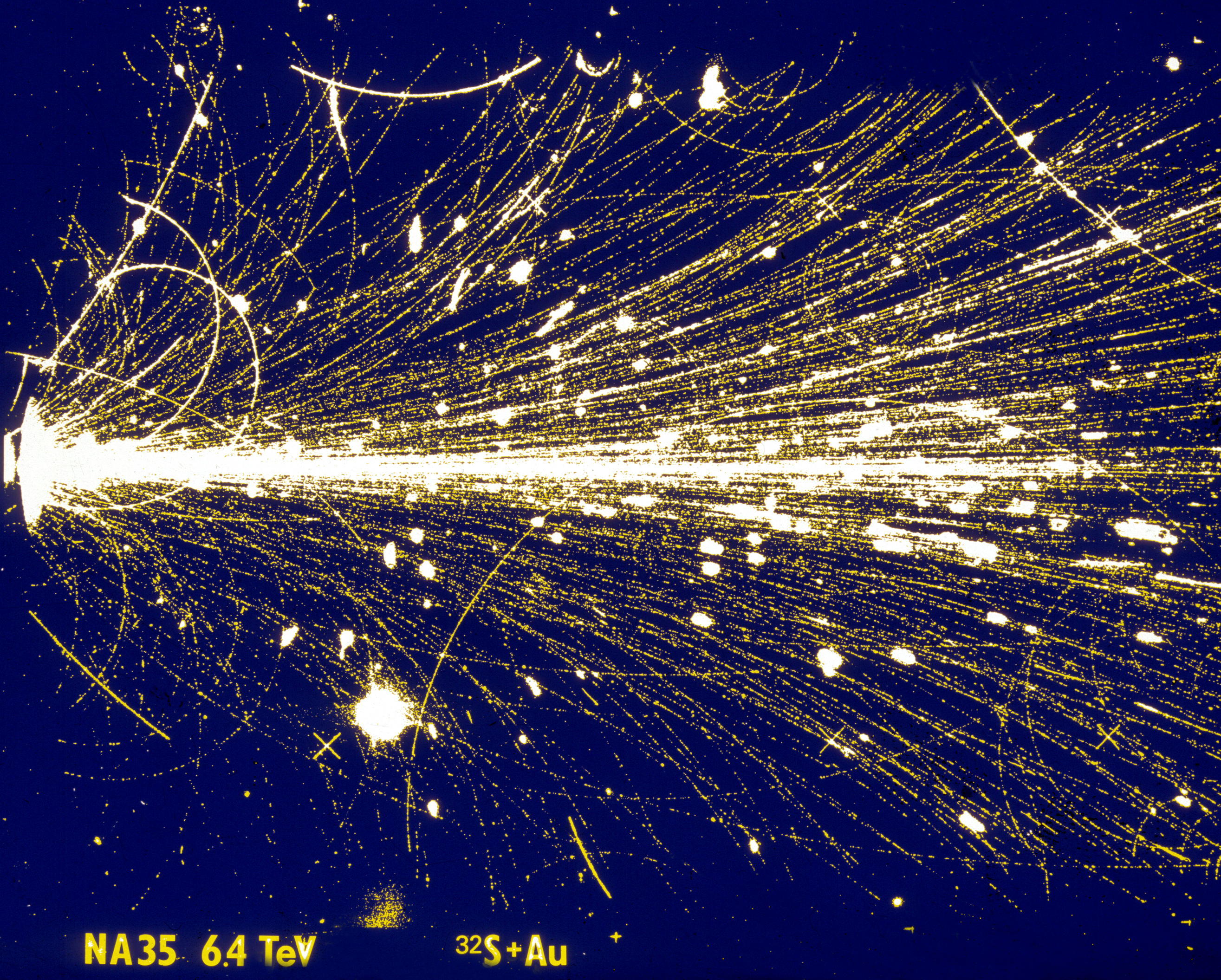
Sulfur-gold collision in NA35 experiment at CERN.

The NA35 experiment was approved on 03 February 1983 and completed on 31 May 1999. It was succeeded by the NA49 experiment. The spokesperson for the experiment was Peter Seyboth.

== See also ==
- NA34/3 experiment
- NA36 experiment
- NA49 experiment
- NA61 experiment
- List of SPS experiments
