= Time-of-flight detector =

Particle detector

A time-of-flight (TOF) detector is a particle detector which can discriminate between a lighter and a heavier elementary particle of same momentum using their time of flight between two scintillators. The first of the scintillators activates a clock upon being hit while the other stops the clock upon being hit. If the two masses are denoted by $m_1$and $m_2$ and have velocities $v_1$ and $v_2$ then the time of flight difference is given by

$$\Delta t = L\left(\frac{1}{v_1}-\frac{1}{v_2}\right)\approx \frac{Lc}{2p^2}(m_1^2-m_2^2)$$

where $L$ is the distance between the scintillators. The approximation is in the relativistic limit at momentum $p$ and $c$ denotes the speed of light in vacuum.

== See also ==
- Time-of-flight mass spectrometry
- Time-to-digital converter
