= Deconfinement =

Phase of matter where certain particles can exist outside of a bound state

In physics, deconfinement (in contrast to confinement) is a phase of matter in which certain particles are allowed to exist as free excitations, rather than only within bound states. Essentially like the early universe, "strongly interacting particles at high temperature or density are expected to produce weakly interacting “deconfined” quarks and gluons [...] the famous quarkgluon plasma."

== Examples ==
Various examples exist in particle physics where certain gauge theories exhibit transitions between confining and deconfining phases.

A prominent example, and the first case considered as such in theoretical physics, occurs at high energy in quantum chromodynamics when quarks and gluons are free to move over distances larger than a femtometer (the size of a hadron). This phase is also called the quark–gluon plasma.

Another way to look at this phenomenon is "spontaneous breaking of gauge symmetry. In terms of the dual gravity theory, such breaking occurs during the formation of a black hole." This view sees "color degrees of freedom in the emergence of the bulk geometry in holographic duality."

These ideas have been adopted in many-body theory of matter. One specific example is how fractons relate to Bose-Hubbard chains. A distinguished example has been developed in the context of the fractional quantum Hall effect.

== See also ==
- Onset of deconfinement
- Colour confinement
- Quark–gluon plasma
- Quark-nova
- Fractionalization
