= Quark–gluon plasma =

State of matter important in cosmology and particle physics

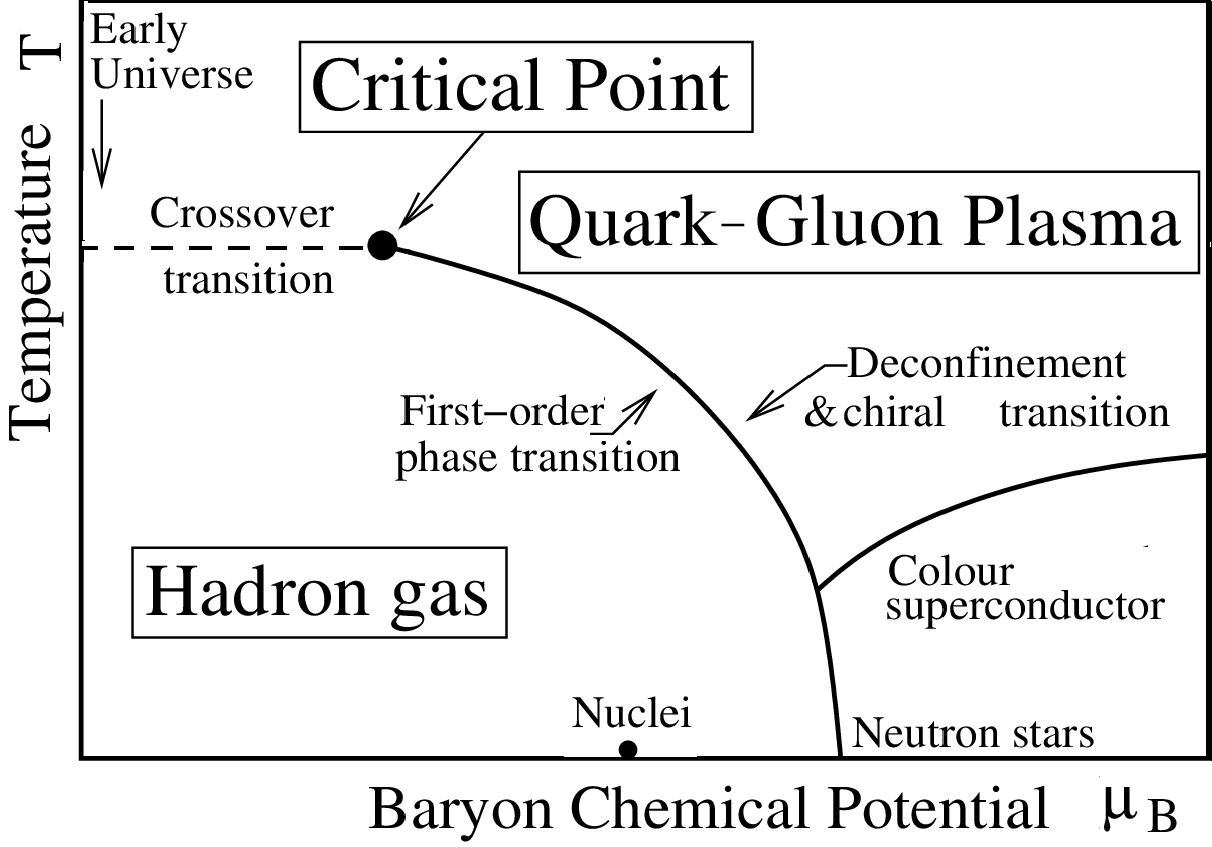
QCD phase diagram. Adapted from original made by R.S. Bhalerao.

Quark–gluon plasma (QGP or quark soup) is an interacting localized assembly of quarks and gluons in chemical equilibrium and local thermal equilibrium. The word plasma signals that free color charges are allowed. In normal matter quarks are confined; in the QGP quarks are deconfined. Quark–gluon plasma (QGP) occurs at energy densities high enough to melt the protons and neutrons that make up the nuclei of normal matter. It is a very low viscosity liquid composed of the elementary particles, quarks and gluons, a state of matter new to physics when it was discovered.

Quark–gluon plasma is studied to understand the characteristics of the universe at about 20 μs after the Big Bang, when the universe was extremely hot and dense. Experimental groups use ultrarelativistic beams of ions colliding with other ions or protons to create this plasma in particle accelerators.

== History ==
Theories predicting the existence of quark–gluon plasma were developed in the late 1970s and early 1980s. The discovery of color confinement and asymptotic freedom properties of quantum chromodynamics (QCD) lead to the realization that quarks would undergo a phase transition at high density. Using an analogy with electromagnetic plasma, in 1978 E V. Shuryak used the term "hadronic plasma" for matter much more dense than atomic nuclei, matter in which hadrons merge and the quarks act collectively. In his next paper he used "quark-gluon plasma", a name that stuck.

In 2000, CERN issued a press release reporting evidence for a new state of matter based on Pb-Pb heavy ion collision studies. The evidence was consistent with "many of the characteristics of the theoretically predicted quark-gluon plasma".

A competing team at Relativistic Heavy Ion Collider (RHIC) characterized the CERN results as "circumstantial" and suggested that the experiments yielded little information about the properties of this new state. A series of Au-Au collision studies from the RHIC published in 2005 showed that the collisions produce something like a liquid in contrast to early theoretical models.

== Role in Standard Model ==
QCD is one part of the modern theory of particle physics called the Standard Model. Other parts of this theory deal with electroweak interactions and neutrinos. The theory of electrodynamics has been tested and found correct to a few parts in a billion. The theory of weak interactions has been tested and found correct to a few parts in a thousand. Perturbative forms of QCD have been tested to a few percent. Perturbative models assume relatively small changes from the ground state, i.e. relatively low temperatures and densities, which simplifies calculations at the cost of generality. In contrast, non-perturbative forms of QCD have barely been tested. The study of the QGP, which has both a high temperature and density, is part of this effort to consolidate the grand theory of particle physics.

The study of the QGP is also a testing ground for finite temperature field theory, a branch of theoretical physics which seeks to understand particle physics under conditions of high temperature. Such studies are important to understand the early evolution of our universe: the first hundred microseconds or so. It is crucial to the physics goals of a new generation of observations of the universe (WMAP and its successors). It is also of relevance to Grand Unification Theories which seek to unify the three fundamental forces of nature (excluding gravity).

=== Occurrence ===
The accepted model of the formation of the Universe states that it happened as the result of the Big Bang. In this model, in the time interval of 10^{−10}–10^{−6} s after the Big Bang, matter existed in the form of a quark–gluon plasma. It is possible to reproduce the density and temperature of matter existing at that time in laboratory conditions to study the characteristics of the very early Universe. So far, the only possibility is the collision of two heavy atomic nuclei accelerated to energies of more than a hundred GeV. Using the result of a head-on collision in the volume approximately equal to the volume of the atomic nucleus, it is possible to model the density and temperature that existed in the first instants of the life of the Universe.

=== Relation to electromagnetic plasma ===
A plasma is matter in which charges are screened due to the presence of other mobile charges. For example: Coulomb's law is suppressed by the screening to yield a distance-dependent charge, $Q \rightarrow Q e^{-r/\alpha}$, i.e., the charge Q is reduced exponentially with the distance divided by a screening length α. In a QGP, the color charge of the quarks and gluons is screened. The QGP has other analogies with a normal plasma. There are also dissimilarities because the color charge is non-abelian, whereas the electric charge is abelian. Outside a finite volume of QGP the color-electric field is not screened, so that a volume of QGP must still be color-neutral. It will therefore, like a nucleus, have integer electric charge.

Because of the extremely high energies involved, quark-antiquark pairs are produced by pair production and thus QGP is a roughly equal mixture of quarks and antiquarks of various flavors, with only a slight excess of quarks. This property is not a general feature of conventional plasmas, which may be too cool for pair production (see however pair instability supernova).

=== Theory ===
One consequence of this difference is that the color charge is too large for perturbative computations which are the mainstay of QED. As a result, the main theoretical tools to explore the theory of the QGP is lattice gauge theory. The transition temperature (approximately 175 MeV) was first predicted by lattice gauge theory. Since then lattice gauge theory has been used to predict many other properties of this kind of matter. The AdS/CFT correspondence conjecture may provide insights in QGP, moreover the ultimate goal of the fluid/gravity correspondence is to understand QGP. The QGP is believed to be a phase of QCD which is completely locally thermalized and thus suitable for an effective fluid dynamic description.

=== Production ===
Production of QGP in the laboratory is achieved by colliding heavy atomic nuclei (called heavy ions as in an accelerator atoms are ionized) at relativistic energy in which matter is heated well above the Hagedorn temperature T_{H} = 150 MeV per particle, which amounts to a temperature exceeding 1.66 trillion K. This can be accomplished by colliding two large nuclei at high energy (note that 175 MeV is not the energy of the colliding beam). Lead and gold nuclei have been used for such collisions at CERN SPS and BNL RHIC, respectively. The nuclei are accelerated to ultrarelativistic speeds (contracting their length) and directed towards each other, creating a "fireball", in the rare event of a collision. Hydrodynamic simulation predicts this fireball will expand under its own pressure, and cool while expanding. By carefully studying the spherical and elliptic flow, experimentalists put the theory to the test.

=== Diagnostic tools ===
Quark–gluon plasma is produced in relativistic heavy ion collisions.

The important classes of experimental observations are

- Thermal photons and thermal dileptons
- Strangeness production
- Elliptic flow
- Jet quenching
- J/ψ melting
- Hanbury Brown and Twiss effect and Bose–Einstein correlations
- Single particle spectra

== Expected properties ==
=== Thermodynamics ===
The cross-over temperature from the normal hadronic to the QGP phase is about 156 MeV. The phenomena involved correspond to an energy density of a little less than 1 GeV/fm^{3}. For relativistic matter, pressure and temperature are not independent variables, so the equation of state is a relation between the energy density and the pressure. This has been found through lattice computations, and compared to both perturbation theory and string theory. This is still a matter of active research. Response functions such as the specific heat and various quark number susceptibilities are currently being computed.

=== Flow ===
The discovery of the perfect liquid was a turning point in physics. Experiments at RHIC have revealed a wealth of information about this remarkable substance, which we now know to be a QGP. Nuclear matter at "room temperature" is known to behave like a superfluid. When heated the nuclear fluid evaporates and turns into a dilute gas of nucleons and, upon further heating, a gas of baryons and mesons (hadrons). At the critical temperature, T_{H}, the hadrons melt and the gas turns back into a liquid. RHIC experiments have shown that this is the most perfect liquid ever observed in any laboratory experiment at any scale. The new phase of matter, consisting of dissolved hadrons, exhibits less resistance to flow than any other known substance. The experiments at RHIC have, already in 2005, shown that the Universe at its beginning was uniformly filled with this type of material—a super-liquid—which once the Universe cooled below T_{H} evaporated into a gas of hadrons. Detailed measurements show that this liquid is a quark–gluon plasma where quarks, antiquarks and gluons flow independently.

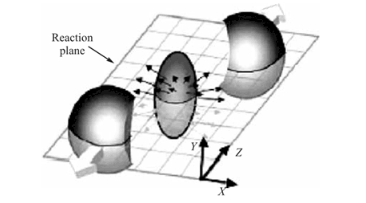
Schematic representation of the interaction region formed in the first moments after the collision of heavy ions with high energies in the accelerator.

In short, a quark–gluon plasma flows like a splat of liquid, and because it is not "transparent" with respect to quarks, it can attenuate jets emitted by collisions. Furthermore, once formed, a ball of quark–gluon plasma, like any hot object, transfers heat internally by radiation. However, unlike in everyday objects, there is enough energy available so that gluons (particles mediating the strong force) collide and produce an excess of the heavy (i.e., high-energy) strange quarks. Whereas, if the QGP did not exist and there was a pure collision, the same energy would be converted into a non-equilibrium mixture containing even heavier quarks such as charm quarks or bottom quarks.

The equation of state is an important input into the flow equations. The speed of sound (speed of QGP-density oscillations) is currently under investigation in lattice computations. The mean free path of quarks and gluons has been computed using perturbation theory as well as string theory. Lattice computations have been slower here, although the first computations of transport coefficients have been concluded. These indicate that the mean free time of quarks and gluons in the QGP may be comparable to the average interparticle spacing: hence the QGP is a liquid as far as its flow properties go. This is very much an active field of research, and these conclusions may evolve rapidly. The incorporation of dissipative phenomena into hydrodynamics is another active research area.

=== Jet quenching effect ===
Detailed predictions were made in the late 1970s for the production of jets at the CERN Super Proton–Antiproton Synchrotron. UA2 observed the first evidence for jet production in hadron collisions in 1981, which shortly after was confirmed by UA1.

The subject was later revived at RHIC. One of the most striking physical effects obtained at RHIC energies is the effect of quenching jets. At the first stage of interaction of colliding relativistic nuclei, partons of the colliding nuclei give rise to the secondary partons with a large transverse impulse ≥ 3–6 GeV/s. Passing through a highly heated compressed plasma, partons lose energy. The magnitude of the energy loss by the parton depends on the properties of the quark–gluon plasma (temperature, density). In addition, it is also necessary to take into account the fact that colored quarks and gluons are the elementary objects of the plasma, which differs from the energy loss by a parton in a medium consisting of colorless hadrons. Under the conditions of a quark–gluon plasma, the energy losses resulting from the RHIC energies by partons are estimated as $\frac{dE}{dx} = 1~\text{GeV/fm}$. This conclusion is confirmed by comparing the relative yield of hadrons with a large transverse impulse in nucleon-nucleon and nucleus-nucleus collisions at the same collision energy. The energy loss by partons with a large transverse impulse in nucleon-nucleon collisions is much smaller than in nucleus-nucleus collisions, which leads to a decrease in the yield of high-energy hadrons in nucleus-nucleus collisions. This result suggests that nuclear collisions cannot be regarded as a simple superposition of nucleon-nucleon collisions. For a short time, ~1 μs, and in the final volume, quarks and gluons form some ideal liquid. The collective properties of this fluid are manifested during its movement as a whole. Therefore, when moving partons in this medium, it is necessary to take into account some collective properties of this quark–gluon liquid. Energy losses depend on the properties of the quark–gluon medium, on the parton density in the resulting fireball, and on the dynamics of its expansion. Losses of energy by light and heavy quarks during the passage of a fireball turn out to be approximately the same.

In November 2010, CERN announced the first direct observation of jet quenching, based on experiments with heavy-ion collisions.

=== Direct photons and dileptons ===
Thermal photons and dileptons are important electromagnetic probes of the quark–gluon plasma (QGP) formed in relativistic heavy-ion collisions. Unlike hadrons, which predominantly reflect the final stages of the collision, electromagnetic probes are emitted throughout the entire space–time evolution of the fireball, from the early deconfined phase through the hadronic stage up to kinetic freeze-out, when strong interactions cease. Because photons and leptons interact only electromagnetically, their mean free path is much larger than the size of the collision volume, allowing them to escape the medium with minimal final-state interactions. As a result, they provide direct information on the temperature and space–time dynamics of the matter created in the collision. The mass of the dileptons in particular help sort out the parton and hadron effects, allowing the study of the average temperature of the plasma and its equilibration time.

=== Glasma hypothesis ===
Since 2008, there is a discussion about a hypothetical precursor state of the quark–gluon plasma, the so-called "Glasma", where the dressed particles are condensed into some kind of glassy (or amorphous) state, below the genuine transition between the confined state and the plasma liquid.

This would be analogous to the formation of metallic glasses.

Although the experimental high temperatures and densities predicted as producing a quark–gluon plasma have been realized in the laboratory, the resulting matter does not behave as a quasi-ideal state of free quarks and gluons, but, rather, as an almost perfect dense fluid. Actually, the fact that the quark–gluon plasma will not yet be "free" at temperatures realized at present accelerators was predicted in 1984, as a consequence of the remnant effects of confinement.

=== Neutron stars ===
It has been hypothesized that the core of some supermassive neutron stars may be a quark–gluon plasma.

== Onset of deconfinement ==
The central issue of the formation of a quark–gluon plasma is the research for the onset of deconfinement. From the beginning of the research on formation of QGP, the issue was whether energy density can be achieved in nucleus-nucleus collisions. This depends on how much energy each nucleon loses. An influential reaction picture was the scaling solution presented by Bjorken. This model applies to ultra-high energy collisions. In experiments carried out at CERN SPS and BNL RHIC more complex situation arose, usually divided into three stages:

- Primary parton collisions and baryon stopping at the time of complete overlapping of the colliding nuclei.
- Redistribution of particle energy and new particles born in the QGP fireball.
- The fireball of QGP matter equilibrates and expands before hadronizing.

More and more experimental evidence points to the strength of QGP formation mechanisms—operating even in LHC-energy scale proton-proton collisions.

== See also ==
- Color confinement
- Color-glass condensate
- Hadrons (that is mesons and baryons)
- Hadronization
- Hagedorn temperature
- Neutron star
- Plasma physics
- QCD matter
- Quantum electrodynamics
- Quantum chromodynamics
- Quantum hydrodynamics
- Relativistic plasma
- Relativistic nuclear collision
- Strangeness production
- Strange matter
- List of unsolved problems in physics
