= High-energy nuclear physics =

Intersection of nuclear physics and high-energy physics

High-energy nuclear physics studies the behavior of nuclear matter in energy regimes typical of high-energy physics. The primary focus of this field is the study of heavy-ion collisions, as compared to lighter atoms in other particle accelerators. At sufficient collision energies, these types of collisions are theorized to produce the quark–gluon plasma. In peripheral nuclear collisions at high energies one expects to obtain information on the electromagnetic production of leptons and mesons that are not accessible in electron–positron colliders due to their much smaller luminosities.

Previous high-energy nuclear accelerator experiments have studied heavy-ion collisions using projectile energies of 1 GeV/nucleon at JINR and LBNL-Bevalac up to 158 GeV/nucleon at CERN-SPS. Experiments of this type, called "fixed-target" experiments, primarily accelerate a "bunch" of ions (typically around 10^{6} to 10^{8} ions per bunch) to speeds approaching the speed of light (0.999c) and smash them into a target of similar heavy ions. While all collision systems are interesting, great focus was applied in the late 1990s to symmetric collision systems of gold beams on gold targets at Brookhaven National Laboratory's Alternating Gradient Synchrotron (AGS) and uranium beams on uranium targets at CERN's Super Proton Synchrotron.

High-energy nuclear physics experiments are continued at the Brookhaven National Laboratory's Relativistic Heavy Ion Collider (RHIC) and at the CERN Large Hadron Collider. At RHIC the programme began with four experiments— PHENIX, STAR, PHOBOS, and BRAHMS—all dedicated to study collisions of highly relativistic nuclei. Unlike fixed-target experiments, collider experiments steer two accelerated beams of ions toward each other at (in the case of RHIC) six interaction regions. At RHIC, ions can be accelerated (depending on the ion size) from 100 GeV/nucleon to 250 GeV/nucleon. Since each colliding ion possesses this energy moving in opposite directions, the maximal energy of the collisions can achieve a center-of-mass collision energy of 200 GeV/nucleon for gold and 500 GeV/nucleon for protons.

The ALICE (A Large Ion Collider Experiment) detector at the LHC at CERN is specialized in studying Pb–Pb nuclei collisions at a center-of-mass energy of 2.76 TeV per nucleon pair. All major LHC detectors—ALICE, ATLAS, CMS and LHCb—participate in the heavy-ion programme.

== History ==
The exploration of hot hadron matter and of multiparticle production has a long history initiated by theoretical work on multiparticle production by Enrico Fermi in the US and Lev Landau in the USSR. These efforts paved the way to the development in the early 1960s of the thermal description of multiparticle production and the statistical bootstrap model by Rolf Hagedorn. These developments led to search for and discovery of quark-gluon plasma. Onset of the production of this new form of matter remains under active investigation.

=== First collisions ===
The first heavy-ion collisions at modestly relativistic conditions were undertaken at the Lawrence Berkeley National Laboratory (LBNL, formerly LBL) at Berkeley, California, U.S.A., and at the Joint Institute for Nuclear Research (JINR) in Dubna, Moscow Oblast, USSR. At the LBL, a transport line was built to carry heavy ions from the heavy-ion accelerator HILAC to the Bevatron. The energy scale at the level of 1–2 GeV per nucleon attained initially yields compressed nuclear matter at few times normal nuclear density. The demonstration of the possibility of studying the properties of compressed and excited nuclear matter motivated research programs at much higher energies in accelerators available at BNL and CERN with relativist beams targeting laboratory fixed targets. The first collider experiments started in 1999 at RHIC, and LHC begun colliding heavy ions at one order of magnitude higher energy in 2010.

== CERN operation ==
The LHC collider at CERN operates one month a year in the nuclear-collision mode, with Pb nuclei colliding at 2.76 TeV per nucleon pair, about 1500 times the energy equivalent of the rest mass. Overall 1250 valence quarks collide, generating a hot quark–gluon soup. Heavy atomic nuclei stripped of their electron cloud are called heavy ions, and one speaks of (ultra)relativistic heavy ions when the kinetic energy exceeds significantly the rest energy, as it is the case at LHC. The outcome of such collisions is production of very many strongly interacting particles.

In August 2012 ALICE scientists announced that their experiments produced quark–gluon plasma with temperature at around 5.5 trillion kelvins, the highest temperature achieved in any physical experiments thus far. This temperature is about 38% higher than the previous record of about 4 trillion kelvins, achieved in the 2010 experiments at the Brookhaven National Laboratory. The ALICE results were announced at the August 13 Quark Matter 2012 conference in Washington, D.C. The quark–gluon plasma produced by these experiments approximates the conditions in the universe that existed microseconds after the Big Bang, before the matter coalesced into atoms.

== Objectives ==
There are several scientific objectives of this international research program:

- The formation and investigation of a new state of matter made of quarks and gluons, the quark–gluon plasma QGP, which prevailed in early universe in first 30 microseconds.
- The study of color confinement and the transformation of color confining = quark confining vacuum state to the excited state physicists call perturbative vacuum, in which quarks and gluons can roam free, which occurs at Hagedorn temperature;
- The study the origins of hadron (proton, neutron etc.) matter mass believed to be related to the phenomenon of quark confinement and vacuum structure.

== Experimental program ==
This experimental program follows on a decade of research at the RHIC collider at BNL and almost two decades of studies using fixed targets at SPS at CERN and AGS at BNL. This experimental program has already confirmed that the extreme conditions of matter necessary to reach QGP phase can be reached. A typical temperature range achieved in the QGP created

$$T = 300~\text{MeV}/k_\text{B} = 3.3 \times 10^{12}~\text{K}$$

is more than 100000 times greater than in the center of the Sun. This corresponds to an energy density

$$\epsilon = 10~\text{GeV/fm}^3 = 1.8 \times 10^{16}~\text{g/cm}^3$$.

The corresponding relativistic-matter pressure is

$$P \simeq \frac{1}{3} \epsilon = 0.52 \times 10^{31}~\text{bar}.$$

== More information ==
- Rutgers University Nuclear Physics Home Page
- Publications - High Energy Nuclear Physics (HENP)
- https://web.archive.org/web/20101212105542/http://www.er.doe.gov/np/
