= Emanuele Quercigh =

Italian particle physicist (born 1934)

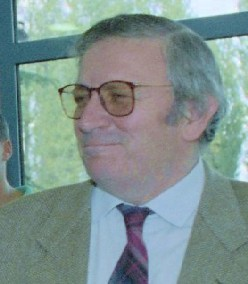
- Born: 1934 (age 91–92); Naples, Italy
- Education: University of Milan
- Known for: Quark–gluon plasma
- Scientific career
- Fields: High-energy physics, hadron physics, quark matter
- Workplaces: University of Milan; CERN
- Doctoral advisor: Giuseppe Occhialini

Emanuele Quercigh (born 1934 in Naples, Italy) is an Italian particle physicist who works since 1964 at CERN, most known for the discovery of quark-gluon plasma (QGP). Quercigh moved as a child to Friuli with his mother and his younger brother after the early death of his father. Quercigh studied physics at the University of Milan in Italy, where he became assistant of professor Giuseppe Occhialini in 1959.

In 1964 Quercigh moved to Geneva, Switzerland, where he took up a position as fellow at CERN and subsequently became a staff physicist. Initially Quercigh took part in various experiments using the CERN 2 m Bubble Chamber. Then he proposed and led, together with David Lord, the ERASME project, a machine for scanning and measuring film from BEBC.

In 1974, Quercigh was appointed spokesperson of the T209 experiment, a bubble chamber experiment studying high statistics 8.25 GeV/c K–p, which discovered the φ(1850) particle–the first Regge recurrence of the φ meson–and performed a detailed study of the lifetime of the Ω–baryon, as well as a first evaluation of its spin.

As of 1979 Quercigh was the leading scientist for various CERN SPS experiments using the Omega Spectrometer, a facility he promoted with colleagues already in 1968, studying quantum chromodynamics (QCD) processes, hadron spectroscopy and particle and soft photon production mechanisms. This activity focused on the production of baryons and anti-baryons carrying one or more strange quarks in heavy-ion collisions. Quercigh was the CERN contact man or spokesman for the WA85, WA94 and WA97 experiments addressing strangeness and quark-gluon plasma. When CERN announced the observation of the QGP in February 2000, he presented the strange particle production results on behalf of these collaborations.

Together with Jürgen Schukraft and Hans Gutbrod, Quercigh laid down the foundations of the LHC ALICE experiment. He was then elected as the first chairman of the ALICE Collaboration Board on 20 April 1994 for the period from 1994 to 1998.

After retirement from CERN in 1999, Quercigh is honorary staff member. In the years 2000, 2001 and 2003 he was guest professor at the University of Padua.

== Publications ==
- (with M. Jacob) Symposium on the CERN Omega Spectrometer : 25 Years of Physics, 19 Mar 1997, CERN, Geneva, Switzerland
- (with S. Hegarty and K. Potter) Joint International Lepton-Photon Symposium and Europhysics Conference on High Energy Physics, Geneva, Switzerland, 25 July – 1 August 1991 (in two volumes,1992)
- List of publications recorded in Inspire-HEP

== Awards and honours ==
- Gold Medal of the Faculty of Mathematics and Physics of Comenius University, Bratislava
- Slovak Academy of Sciences' Diorys llkovic Gold Honour Medal for Achievements in Physics
