= Big European Bubble Chamber =

Particle detector used at CERN 1973–84

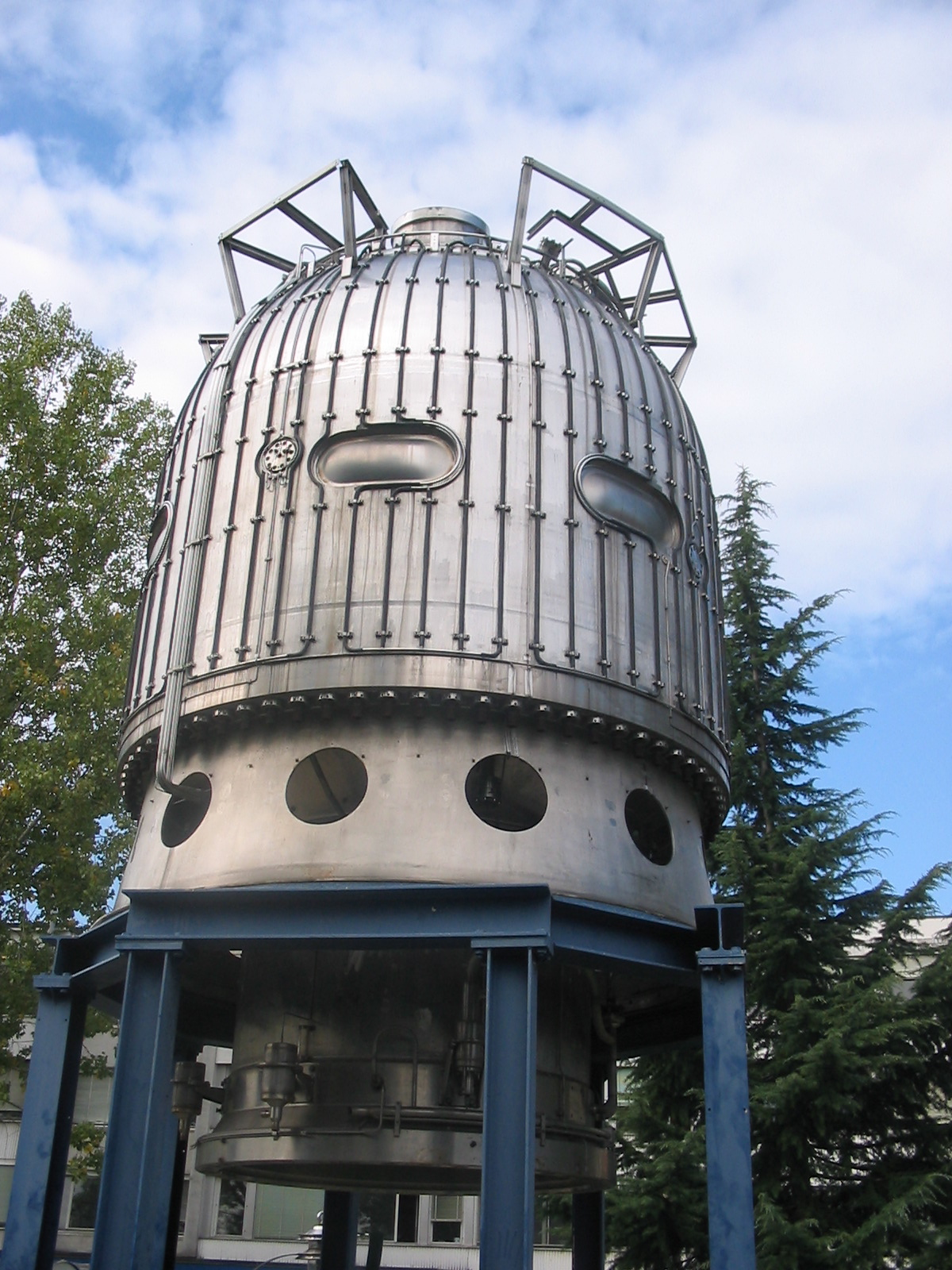
The Big European Bubble Chamber on display at the Microcosm museum

The Big European Bubble Chamber (BEBC) is a large detector formerly used to study particle physics at CERN. The chamber body, a stainless-steel vessel, was filled with 35 cubic metres of superheated liquid hydrogen, liquid deuterium, or a neon-hydrogen mixture, whose sensitivity was regulated by means of a movable piston weighing 2 tons. The liquids at typical operation temperatures around 27 K were placed under overpressure of about 5 standard atmospheres (510 kPa). The piston expansion, synchronized with the charged particle beam crossing the chamber volume, caused a rapid pressure drop; in consequence the liquid reached its boiling point. During each expansion, charged particles ionized the atoms of the liquid as they passed through it and the energy deposited by them initiated boiling along their path, leaving trails of tiny bubbles. These tracks were photographed by the five cameras mounted on top of the chamber. The stereo photographs were subsequently scanned and all events finally evaluated by a team of scientists. After each expansion, the pressure was increased again to stop the boiling. The bubble chamber was then ready again for a new cycle of beam exposure.

The conception and construction of giant bubble chambers such as Gargamelle and BEBC was based on know-how acquired through the construction and operation of smaller bubble chambers such as the 30 cm hydrogen chamber, which came into operation at CERN in 1960, and the 2 m hydrogen chamber four years later.

The BEBC project was launched in 1966 by CERN, France (Saclay), and Germany (DESY) and installed at CERN in the early 1970s. The chamber body was surrounded by the then-largest superconducting solenoid magnet of two coils in a Helmholtz arrangement. The magnet coils were fabricated at CERN using copper-reinforced niobium–titanium superconductor cable. The BEBC coils created a strong magnetic field of 3.5 T over the sensitive volume of the chamber. Thus, the fast charged particles passing through the chamber were bent in the magnetic field, providing information on their momentum.

The first images were recorded in 1973 when BEBC first received a beam from the Proton Synchrotron (PS). From 1977 to 1984, the chamber took photos in the West Area neutrino beam line of the Super Proton Synchrotron (SPS) and in hadron beams at energies of up to 450 GeV. During 1978, a Track-Sensitive Target (TST) was installed to combine the advantages of hydrogen and heavy liquid bubble chambers. Hydrogen-filled chambers enable the study of particle interactions with free protons but they have a low efficiency for gamma ray conversion. On the other hand, heavy liquid filling is better suited for the detection of gamma rays but the events are harder to interpret. An External Muon Identifier (EMI) and an External Particle Identifier (EPI) were added to the BEBC in 1979 to respectively identify muons and charged hadrons leaving the chamber. Furthermore, an Internal Picket Fence (IPF) was used to obtain timing signals for events occurring in the bubble chamber, helping to suppress the background. These changes transformed BEBC into a hybrid detector.

The BEBC experiments were: T225/231, T243, WA17, WA19, WA20, WA21, WA22, W24, WA25, WA26, WA27, WA28, WA30, WA31, WA32, WA47, WA51, WA52, WA59, WA66, WA73, and PS180. By the end of its active life in 1984, BEBC had delivered a total of 6.3 million photographs to 22 experiments. Around 600 scientists from some fifty laboratories throughout the world had taken part in analyzing the 3000 km of film it had produced. BEBC enabled the discovery of D-mesons and promoted the developments of neutrino and hadron physics, carrying out one of the richest physics programs. It is now on display at CERN's Microcosm Museum.

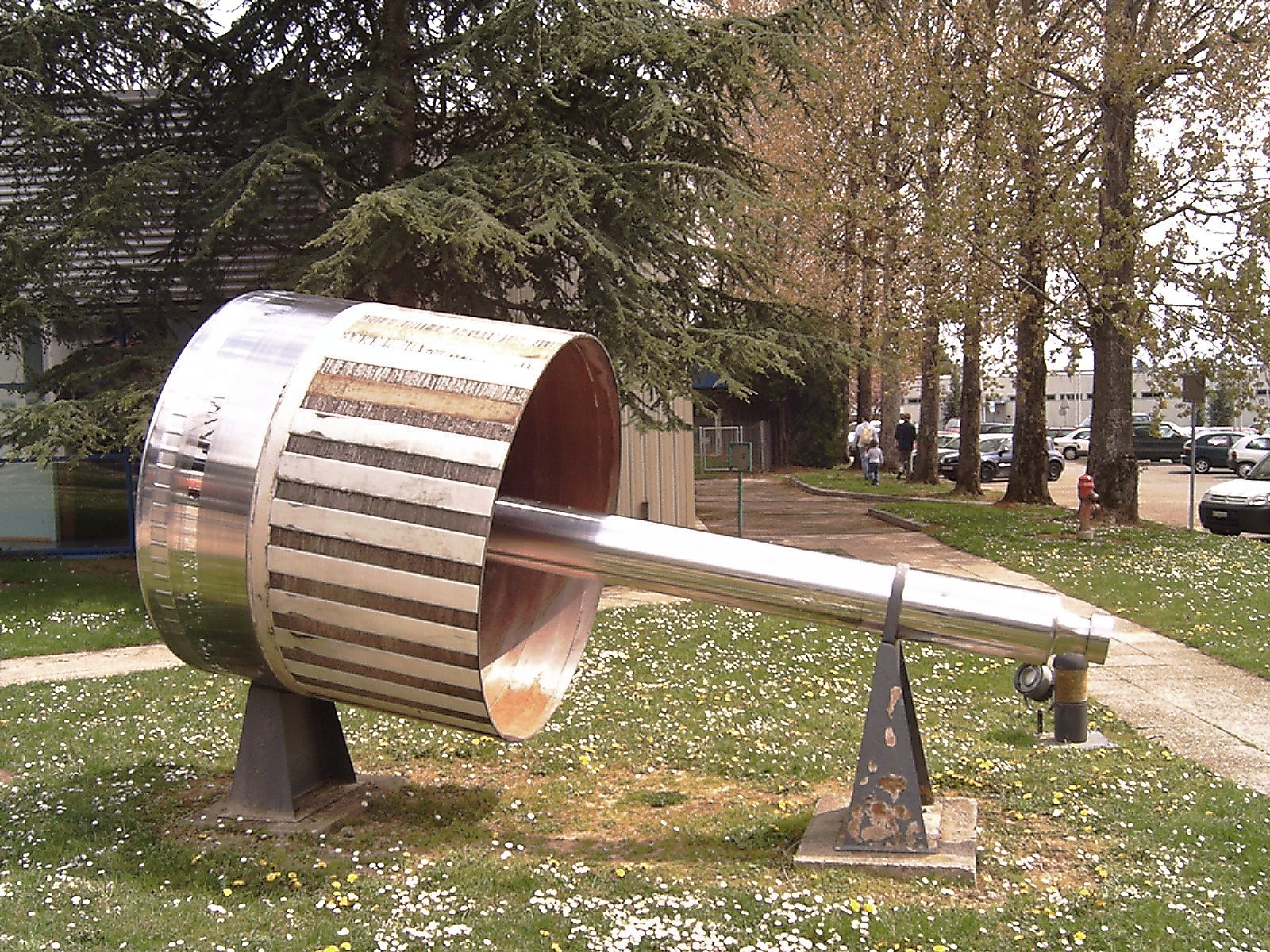
The piston

== See also ==
- Bubble chamber
- Gargamelle
