= PICO =

PICO is an experiment searching for direct evidence of dark matter using a bubble chamber of chlorofluorocarbon (freon) as the active mass. It is located at SNOLAB in Canada.

It was formed in 2013 from the merger of two similar experiments, PICASSO and COUPP.

PICASSO (Project In CAnada to Search for Supersymmetric Objects, or Projet d'Identification de CAndidats Supersymétriques SOmbres in French) was an international collaboration with members from the Université de Montréal, Queen's University, Indiana University South Bend and Czech Technical University in Prague, University of Alberta, Laurentian University and BTI, Chalk River, Ontario. PICASSO was predominantly sensitive to spin-dependent interactions of Weakly Interacting Massive Particles (WIMPs) with fluorine atoms.

COUPP (Chicagoland Observatory for Underground Particle Physics) was a similar project with members from Fermilab, University of Chicago, and Indiana University. Prototypes were tested in the MINOS experiment far hall, with a scaled-up experiment also operating at SNOLAB. It used trifluoroiodomethane (CF_{3}I) as the medium.

== Principle ==
A bubble detector is a radiation sensitive device that uses small droplets of superheated liquid that are suspended in a gel matrix. It uses the principle of a bubble chamber but since only the small droplets can undergo a phase transition at a time, the detector can stay active for much longer periods than a classic bubble chamber. When enough energy is deposited in a droplet by ionizing radiation the superheated droplet undergoes a phase transition and becomes a gas bubble. The PICASSO detectors contain Freon droplets with an average diameter of 200 μm. The bubble development in the detector is accompanied by an acoustic shock wave that is picked up by piezo-electric sensors. The main advantage of the bubble detector technique is that the detector is almost insensitive to background radiation. The detector sensitivity can be adjusted by changing the temperature of the droplets. Freon-loaded detectors are typically operated at temperatures between 15–55 °C (60–130 °F).

The validity of the bubble detector concept has been shown in several publications. There is another similar experiment using this technique in Europe called SIMPLE.

== PICASSO ==
The PICASSO experiment operated at SNOLAB. It had two science runs: first with 2 (results published in 2009) and later with 10 (results published 2012) detector elements. The final configuration of the detector had 32 detector elements (results not published). It found no dark matter signal.

== COUPP ==
The COUPP collaboration operated a bubble chamber in Fermilab 2011-2012. Particles from a particle accelerator beam were fired at the chamber to evaluate the technology for dark matter detection.

The COUPP collaboration operated a bubble chamber with 3.5 kg CF_{3}I in the MINOS underground area at Fermilab. The results were published January 2011. The COUPP collaboration also operated the same bubble chamber with 4 kg CF_{3}I in SNOLAB from September 2010 to August 2011. SNOLAB-results (also called COUPP-4 kg) were published in 2012. No dark matter was detected.

== Results of PICASSO and COUPP ==
PICASSO reports results (November 2009) for spin-dependent WIMP interactions on ^{19}F. No dark matter signal has been found, but for WIMP masses of 24 GeV/c^{2} new stringent limits have been obtained on the spin-dependent cross section for WIMP scattering on ^{19}F of 13.9 pb (90% CL). This result has been converted into a cross section limit for WIMP interactions on protons of 0.16 pb (90% CL). The obtained limits restrict recent interpretations of the DAMA/LIBRA annual modulation effect in terms of spin dependent interactions.

New results were published in May 2012, using 10 detectors with total exposure 14 kg·d, to constrain low-mass WIMP interaction on ^{19}F. The best spin-dependent limits were obtained for a 20 GeV/c^{2} WIMP mass: 0.032 pb (90% C.L.) for proton cross section. For the Spin-independent near 7 GeV low mass region cross section: 1.41×10^{−4} pb upper limit (90% C.L.)

== PICO ==
The PICO project started when the PICASSO and COUPP groups merged in 2013. The PICO experiment is located in SNOLAB, Canada, in a mine at the depth of 2 km. As of 2018, the PICO collaboration has operated two experiments in SNOLAB: a bubble chamber called PICO-2L and a chamber called PICO-60 (formerly named COUPP-60), where the numbers 2 and 60 refer to the volume (in litres) of the target material in each chamber. The target material used was C_{3}F_{8}. A larger version of the experiment is being planned as of 2018. The larger version would have a target volume of 250-500 litres (called PICO-250 or PICO-500, respectively).

PICO-2L: PICO-2L was the first bubble chamber to start operation in October 2013. Its science runs took place October 2013-May 2014 (science run 1) and February 2015-November 2015 (science run 2). PICO-2L was decommissioned in 2016.

PICO-60: The PICO-60 followed PICO-2L. It started data-taking in 2013 and this first science run continued until May 2014. For this first run, the detector was filled with CF_{3}I and the detector only used about half its capacity in terms if active volume (the active volume was 25 litres). After this initial run, the detector was refurbished, the target material was switched to C_{3}F_{8} and the active volume was increased to full capacity (53 litres). The refurbishing work was completed and the second science run started summer 2016. The second science run ended in the summer of 2017, after which PICO-60 was decommissioned.

PICO-40L: The PICO-60 experimental station is used for a new bubble chamber called PICO-40L. The PICO-40L is a new type of bubble chamber whose technical structure eliminates the need for a buffer liquid that is a source of measurement noise. The PICO-40L began construction at SNOLAB in 2019 and was finished in 2020. Currently new systems of the detector are being commissioned.

PICO-500L: PICO-500 is the next generation detector that builds upon the principle demonstrated by PICO-2L, -60, and -40L. The scaled-up detector will have an active volume of about 250 litres and will use a synthetic quartz vessel, just like PICO-2L, PICO-60 and PICO-40L before it. The PICO collaboration is currently working on the final design of the PICO-500 design, focusing on the inner vessel and the pressure vessel. PICO is planning to operate PICO-500 with C_{3}F_{8} to achieve a world leading sensitivity for dark matter coupling to ordinary matter though its spin. The experiment has received full funding from CFI and the Canadian provinces. SNOLAB has approved the conceptual design of the experiment and allocated space in the underground facility for PICO-500 in the cube hall area of the lab.

The PICO collaboration also has a number of bubble chambers used for calibration purposes (not for dark matter detection), like the CIRTE (COUPP Iodine Recoil Efficiency) and PICO-0.1 chambers.
