= Geoff Hall (physicist) =

British physicist

Geoffrey Hall FRS
- Born: UK
- Education: Imperial College London
- Known for: Particle physics
- Awards: Duddell Medal 2004; James Chadwick Medal 2020
- Scientific career
- Workplaces: Imperial College London
- Website: Official website

Geoffrey Hall is a British particle physicist, currently Professor of Physics at Imperial College London. He is best known for developing radiation and particle detectors and other electronic instruments for use in particle physics experiments, notably the CMS detector in CERN's Large Hadron Collider (a project on which he has worked for three decades).

== Scientific career ==
Hall began his research career as a post-doctoral research assistant at Imperial College in 1974 and, except for brief periods at the University of California, Santa Cruz and CERN, has worked there ever since. Since 1992, he has worked on the development of CERN's CMS detector (part of the LHC project), which played a key role in the discovery of the Higgs boson in 2012.

As part of the Stanford Linear Accelerator project in the 1970s, Hall worked with bubble chamber detectors and later developed gas Cherenkov counters for research into the lifetimes of charmed quarks.

Hall joined CERN's CMS project in 1992, working mainly on tracking detectors and readout electronics. One of his biggest challenges on the CMS project was to develop detectors that could survive the intense radiation near the LHC's colliding proton beams for long enough to capture useful data. Since the discovery of the Higgs boson, Hall's attention has focused on extending the lifetime of the LHC project.

== Awards ==
Hall has received multiple honours and awards for his work, including the Duddell Medal and Prize (2004) and the James Chadwick Medal and Prize (2020), both awarded by the Institute of Physics. He was elected a Fellow of the Royal Society in 2021.

== Selected publications ==
- Hall, G (2010). "8: Innovations in the CMS Tracker Electronics". In Green, Dan (ed.). At the Leading Edge: The ATLAS and CMS LHC Experiments. World Scientific. pp. 205–232. ISBN 9789814277617.
