= Holographic Lexan Bubble Chamber =

The Holographic Lexan Bubble Chamber, HOLEBC, was a hydrogen bubble chamber.

Bubble chambers are similar to cloud chambers, both in application and in basic principle. A chamber is normally made by filling a large cylinder with a liquid heated to just below its boiling point. As particles enter the chamber, a piston suddenly decreases its pressure, and the liquid enters into a superheated, metastable phase. Charged particles create an ionization track, around which the liquid vaporizes, forming microscopic bubbles. Bubble density around a track is proportional to a particle's energy loss. Bubbles grow in size as the chamber expands, until they are large enough to be seen or photographed. Several cameras are mounted around it, allowing a three-dimensional image of an event to be captured.

The HOLEBC chamber was built to be used with the huge European Hybrid Spectrometer at CERN to measure the momentum of particles as they emerged from the chamber.

== See also ==
- Bubble chamber
