= Colin Windsor =

British physicist

Colin George Windsor FRS (born 28 June 1938) is a British physicist, and was Programme Area Manager, for the United Kingdom Atomic Energy Authority

== Life ==
He was born in London and attended Beckenham and Penge Grammar School. He won a scholarship to Magdalen College, Oxford, earning a BA with First Class Honours in Physics, and a DPhil in 1963.

He conducted magnetic resonance research, at Clarendon Laboratory in 1963. He was Resident Fellow at Yale University in 1964. He conducted Neutron scattering research, at the Atomic Energy Research Establishment, Harwell from 1964 to 1998.

He won the Duddell Medal and Prize in 1987.

He was elected a Fellow of the Royal Society in 1995

From 1998 to 2013 he was a consultant at Culham Centre for Fusion Energy.

From 2013 to 2023 he was a consultant to the Oxfordshire fusion company Tokamak Energy.

== Works ==
- Pulsed Neutron Scattering, Taylor & Francis, 1981, ISBN 978-0-470-27131-5
- Four computer models for the ZX81 micro-computer, C.G. Windsor, 1983, ISBN 978-0-9509197-0-6
- D. L. Weaire, Colin G. Windsor (eds) Solid state science: past, present, and predicted, A. Hilger, 1987, ISBN 978-0-85274-584-7
