= Michael Anthony Flemming =

British physicist

Michael Anthony Flemming (born 1948) is a British physicist. He was educated at King George V GS, Southport, from where he gained a place to read Physics at New College, Oxford, specializing in solid-state physics and electronics. He continued his doctoral studies in the Electronics Department at Southampton University, where he used the micro-electronics facility to fabricate high-frequency transistors and developed a test facility based on miniaturised microstrip probes - a technique which has subsequently formed a basis for commercial wafer probing systems.

Following conferment of his PhD, he joined the Plessey Radar Research Centre, where he carried out pioneering work on Harmonic Radar. This has found applications in several fields where transponders are needed to allow tracking of small objects; one example is the monitoring of bee populations.

He then worked at the UKAEA Harwell research laboratory, where he led the Radio Frequency and Microwave Section. He was awarded the Duddell Medal and Prize by the Institute of Physics in 1993 for his work on the application of microwave ellipsometry to the detection of thin surface films of oil on water.
