= Ramsey Faragher =

British physicist and positioning specialist

- Born: 1981 (age 44–45); England
- Education: Cambridge University
- Known for: NAVSOP and Supercorrelation (S-GPS)
- Awards: BAE Systems Early Career Engineer of the Year 2009, Institute of Navigation Burka Award 2016, GPS World Signals Leadership Award 2019, Institute of Navigation Per Enge Award 2019, Royal Institute of Navigation Harold Spencer-Jones Gold Medal 2023, Institute of Physics Dennis Gabor Medal 2023
- Scientific career
- Fields: Navigation
- Workplaces: Cambridge University
- Doctoral advisor: Peter Duffett Smith
- Website: sites.google.com/view/ramseyfaragher/

Ramsey Faragher is the Director and Chief Executive Officer of the Royal Institute of Navigation.

He is also a bye-fellow of Queens' College and lives in Cambridge with his wife and three children.

== Education ==
Faragher graduated with a Bachelor of Arts, and Master of Science degrees in experimental and theoretical physics from the University of Cambridge in 2004. In 2008 he was awarded a PhD, supervised by Peter Duffett Smith with a thesis on the effects of multipath interference on radio positioning systems.

== Career ==
On completing his PhD, Faragher worked for BAE Systems where he was a technical lead for a number of navigation, tracking, and sensor fusion programmes, building on expertise in GPS-denied navigation using novel methods including opportunistic radio signals. He also developed the award-winning NAVSOP positioning suite. From 2013 to 2015 he was a Senior Research Associate at the University of Cambridge Computer Laboratory in England, working in the Digital Technology Group on infrastructure-free smartphone positioning. Faragher founded Focal Point Positioning in 2015 with members of the original NAVSOP team. He is also a Director of Studies in Computer Science at Queens' College.

=== Awards and recognition ===
In 2014 Faragher was awarded a Fellowship by the Royal Institute of Navigation. In June 2020 Focal Point Positioning was awarded both The Duke of Edinburgh's Navigation Award for Outstanding Technical Achievement from the Royal Institute of Navigation, and the Hottest SpaceTech Startup in Europe accolade from the Europas. In 2023 Faragher was awarded both the Harold Spencer-Jones Gold Medal by the Royal Institute of Navigation, and the Dennis Gabor Medal and Prize by the Institute of Physics.

His work in industry was also recognised by Top Gear, who described Faragher as a real-life Q. In 2020 Faragher was named by Wired magazine as one of 32 innovators who are building a better future. In 2024 Faragher was a lead author on the OpsGroup report into the impact of GPS Spoofing on the civil aviation sector and also chaired the Best Practices for Resilient PNT committee at the Royal Institute of Navigation. This committee is producing guidance for UK Critical National Infrastructure with support from the UK Government

== Selected works ==
- Faragher, Ramsey; Harle, Robert (6 May 2015). "Location fingerprinting with bluetooth low energy beacons". IEEE Journal on Selected Areas in Communications. 33 (11): 2418–2428. doi:10.1109/JSAC.2015.2430281.
- Faragher, Ramsey (22 August 2012). "Understanding the Basis of the Kalman Filter Via a Simple and Intuitive Derivation". IEEE Signal Processing Magazine. 29 (12). doi:10.1109/MSP.2012.2203621.
