= List of fellows of the Royal Society elected in 1978 =

This is a list of fellows of the Royal Society elected in 1978.

== Fellows ==
- Roger Yate Stanier (1916–1982)
- Sir Graham Selby Wilson (1895–1987)
- Alan Frank Gibson (1923–1988)
- Richard Rado (1906–1989)
- Malcolm Davenport Milne (1915–1991)
- Fergus William Campbell (1924–1993)
- Janos Szentagothai (1912–1994)
- Hans Walter Kosterlitz (1903–1996)
- Thomas Philip Stroud Powell (1923–1996)
- Torbjorn Oskar Caspersson (1910–1997)
- James Stanley Hey (1909–2000)
- Barry Edward Johnson (1937–2002)
- Sir Frederick William Page (1917–2005)
- John Rodney Quayle (d. 2006)
- Alastair Ian Scott (1928–2007)
- Donald Allan Ramsay (d. 2007)
- Joseph Victor Smith (d. 2007)
- Sir Denis Eric Rooke (d. 2008)
- John Lander Harper (d. 2009)
- George Alan Garton (d. 2010)
- Har Gobind Khorana (1922–2011)
- John Arthur Joseph Pateman (1926–2011)
- John Murdoch Mitchison (d. 2011)
- Ainsley Iggo (1924–2012)
- Charles Walter Suckling (1920–2013)
- Sir Jack Edward Baldwin
- Norman Keith Boardman
- Alexander Boksenberg
- Keith Anthony Browning
- Philip George Burke
- Sydney Cohen
- Roger Arthur Cowley
- Gordon Henry Dixon
- Murray Gell-Mann (1929–2019)
- Archibald Howie
- Donald Lynden-Bell
- John (Jake) MacMillan
- Sir Robin Buchanan Nicholson
- Ronald Oxburgh, Baron Oxburgh
- Bernard Leslie Shaw
- John Hyslop Steele (1926–2013)
- John Francis Talling (1929–2017)
- Edwin William Taylor
- Peter Whittle
- Charles, Prince of Wales
