= Royal Institute of Navigation =

UK learned society advancing the science of positioning, navigation and timing

- Formation: Established 1947
- Headquarters: The Royal Institute of Navigation 1 Kensington Gore London
- President: Professor Washington Yotto Ochieng, CBE
- Director: Ramsey Faragher
- Website: rin.org.uk

The Royal Institute of Navigation (RIN) is a learned society and a professional body for navigation. The RIN was founded in 1947 as a forum for mariners, pilots, engineers and academics to compare their experiences and exchange information. Today it is a leading centre for promoting knowledge in navigation and its associated sciences, including positioning, timing, tracking and conduct of a journey, whether on, in, over or under land, sea, air or space. The institute has members in over 50 countries worldwide.

== History ==
The organisation was formed in 1947 as the Institute of Navigation and was patterned after the US Institute of Navigation. Both organisations had been influenced by the role navigation had helped in moving troops and supplies during Second World War. Emerging technology such as radar and LORAN increased in the years following the war. The institute sought to provide a forum where academics, engineers, mariners, and pilots could learn, exchange information, and share personal experiences.

The institute's founding membership included several notable professionals in the field. From the field of astronomy Sir Harold Spencer Jones, the Astronomer-Royal was the first president. The first two vice-presidents represented the field of aviation in Air Chief Marshal Sir John Slessor (Deputy Chief of the Air Staff) and the development of radar in Sir Robert Watson-Watt. Marine navigation was represented by Michael Richey who became the first executive secretary from 1947 to 1982. In 1948, Richey would found the institute's official academic publication, the Journal of Navigation and edit the journal until 1986. Sir Robert Watson-Watt would become the second president of the institute.

The institute expanded its focus in the 1950s and 1960s to also address issues of safety and began collaborating with similar organizations in Europe. In 1972, at its 25th anniversary, its work was recognized by Her Majesty the Queen and it became entitled to the "Royal" prefix and was renamed the Royal Institute of Navigation. Some of the presidents of the institute during this time included Donald Sadler (the astronomer and mathematician) who was president from 1953 to 1955, Rear Admiral Edmund George Irving who was president from 1964 to 1967 and Rear Admiral George Stephen Ritchie who was president from 1970 to 1972.

More recently, the institute has broadened its activities to include significant developments in the understanding and applications of cognitive navigation, human factors and animal navigation. The institute also fulfills an important role in the provision of guidance information for practical navigators including private pilots and small boat mariners.

From 2005 to 2008, the president of the institute was Professor J D Last, a consultant engineer and expert in communications systems who subsequently died at sea in a plane crash in November 2019. Roger McKinlay, an engineer was president from 2013 to 2015 and in 2015 said that increasing dependence on technology means people were losing their ability to find their way by traditional methods, specifically stating society was "sedated by software". In 2015, McKinlay was replaced by Captain J B Taylor OBE, who was elected president until 2018.

In 2017, Jottle Pottle, a communications engineer was appointed as director of the institute. From 2018 to 2021, the president of the RIN was Terry Moore, a positioning and navigation expert at the University of Nottingham. While President, Moore focused on expanding awareness of issues relating to positioning, navigation and timing (PNT), in particular stating that "Reliable position and timing are strategically important resources and that having control over them is important in the same way as having secure energy supplies." In 2021, Cynthia Robertson, an RYA Yachtmaster Examiner and Fellow of the society was elected as the first female president of the institute.

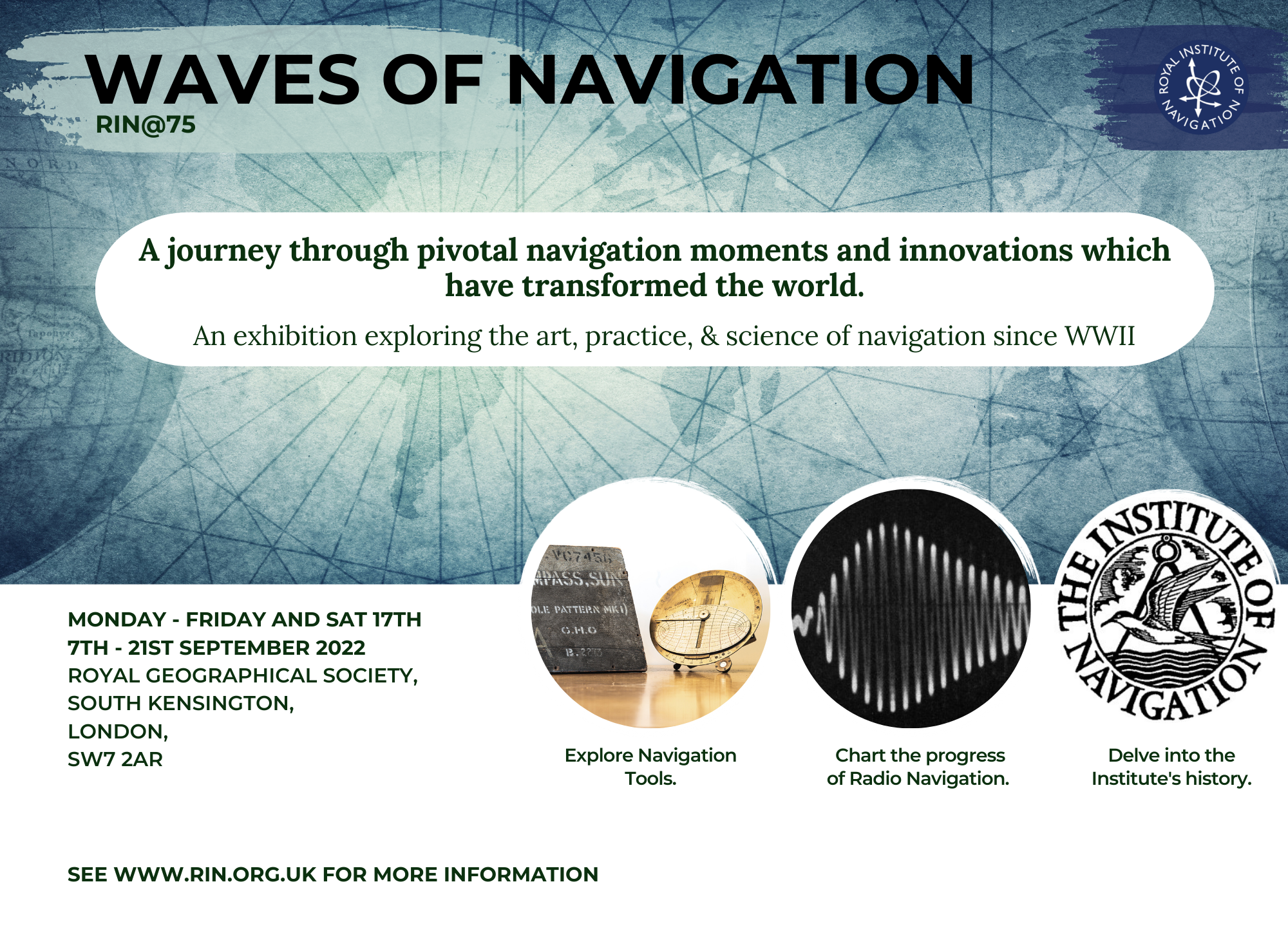
Waves of Navigation – part of a series of events to commemorate the Institute's 75th anniversary year in 2022.

In 2022, the institute hosted its Waves of Navigation exhibition in London as part of its commemorations to mark its 75th anniversary. This include a 75th Anniversary Reception at St James's Palace hosted by the Princess Royal.

In June 2024, Professor Washington Yotto Ochieng was elected president succeeding President Cynthia Robertson.

In 2025, Dr Ramsey Faragher, an expert in radio positioning technologies, became the 6th Director of the RIN replacing John Pottle.

== Governance ==
The institute is a UK-registered charity with a Royal Charter. The charity registration is 1117254.

The institute is governed by its board of trustees called the council, which is chaired by its president. The members of council and the president are elected from the institute's membership and serve for up to a three-year term.

The institute has four specialist committees to advise the council: the technical committee, audit and risk committee, membership and fellowship committee, and the remuneration committee.

== Membership ==
Membership is available to anyone in the world with an interest in navigation or its associated sciences. There are five categories of individual membership:

- The most popular membership is that of Ordinary Member providing full membership benefits and allowing the individual to adopt the post nominal letters MRIN.
- Associate status offers affiliate status with the institute and does not allow the individual to hold office.
- There are two categories of membership designed for younger members - Junior Associate, for those under 18 years of age and Student for those under 25.
- The institute also offers the possibility to progress to Associate Fellow or Fellow membership for those that have achieved a high level of professional involvement or achievement in navigation or its associated sciences or have made a significant contribution to navigation, respectively.

The institute also offers a number of plans tailored to corporate bodies including businesses, clubs and universities.

== Professional registration ==
Through being a professional affiliate of the UK's Engineering Council (EngC), the institute offers professional registration to the Engineering Council's registers in the following three categories of professional engineers and technicians:

- Chartered Engineer (CEng)
- Incorporated Engineer (IEng)
- Engineering Technician (EngTech)

Any member of the institute who can demonstrate professional competence and commitment is able to apply for professional registration through the RIN. It is expected that registered members are committed to maintaining their professional standard through ongoing continuous professional development.

== Special Interest Groups ==
The institute hosts a number of Special Interest Groups (SIGs) catering for members' interests in specific areas; all SIGs are organised and run from within the institute's membership.

The institute's active SIGs are the Small Craft Group, Cognition and Navigation Group, Animal Navigation Group, General Aviation Navigation Group, History of Navigation Group, Professional Marine Navigation Group, Civil and Military Aviation Group, and the Early Career Network.

== Activities ==
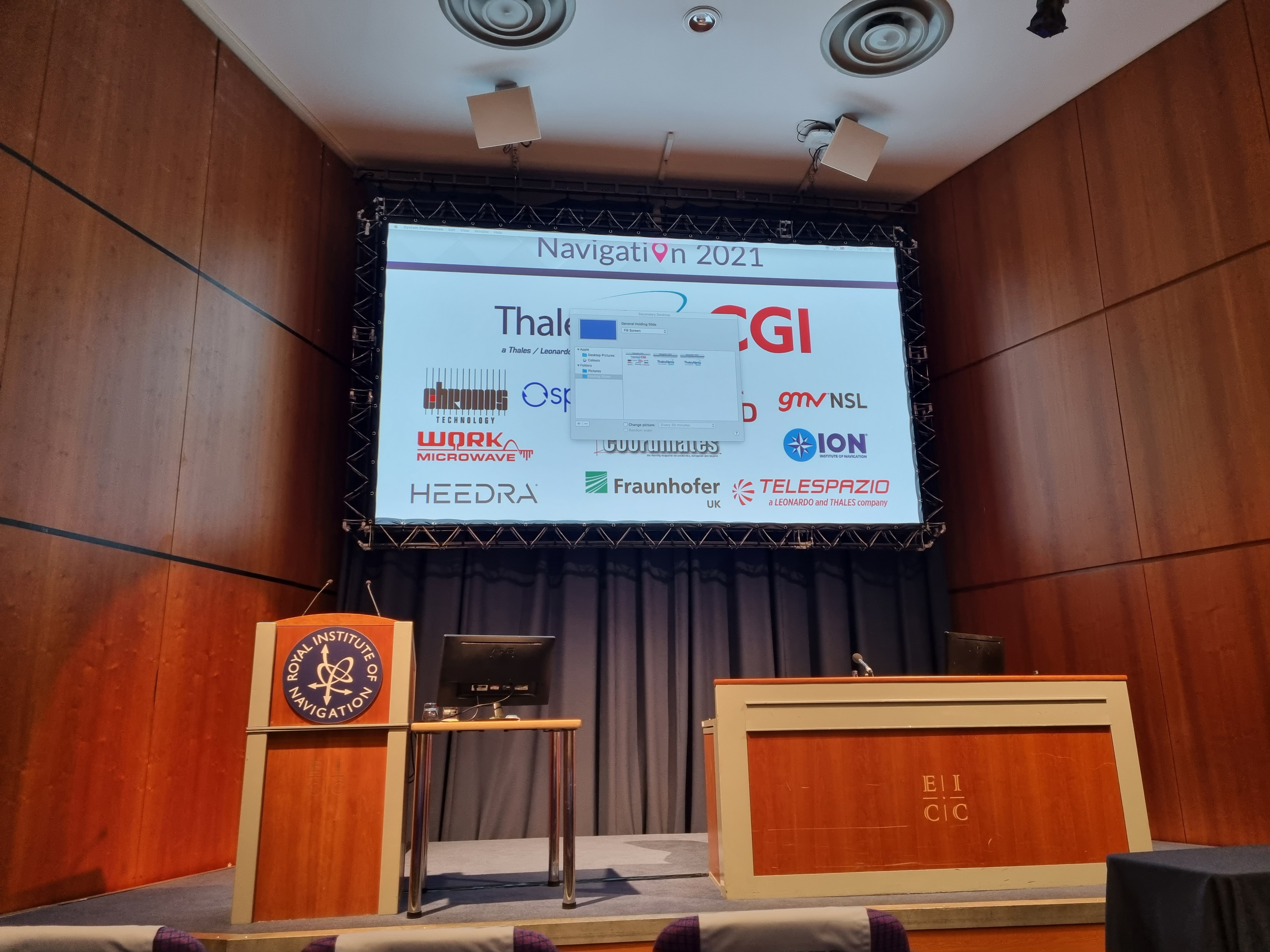
Royal Institute of Navigation Conference, Edinburgh 2021.

The institute sponsors conferences, publications, and reports related to navigation and its associated sciences. The institute may publish position papers or white papers in relation to current navigation-related developments.

In 2017 its international conference included contemporary topics as artificial intelligence, cyber threats, and machine learning. It also co-sponsored a report to the UK government on the economic impact of a 5-day loss of geopositioning systems.

In 2019, the institute launched an online 'Resilient positioning, navigation, and timing (PNT) Portal.

Following the COVID-19 pandemic, many of the institute's activities transitioned to virtual events.

In November 2021, the institute held its 2021 Conference in Edinburgh at the Edinburgh International Conference Centre in a hybrid physical and virtual format. HRH The Princess Royal (Princess Anne) attended via Zoom.

Since November 2022, the institute has held an annual Leadership Seminar on PNT at the Royal Society in London. In 2024, a set of best practice principles and a checklist for PNT was launched at the annual PNT leadership seminar. The event included a speech by the UK Science Minister Lord Vallance.

== Awards and Scholarships ==
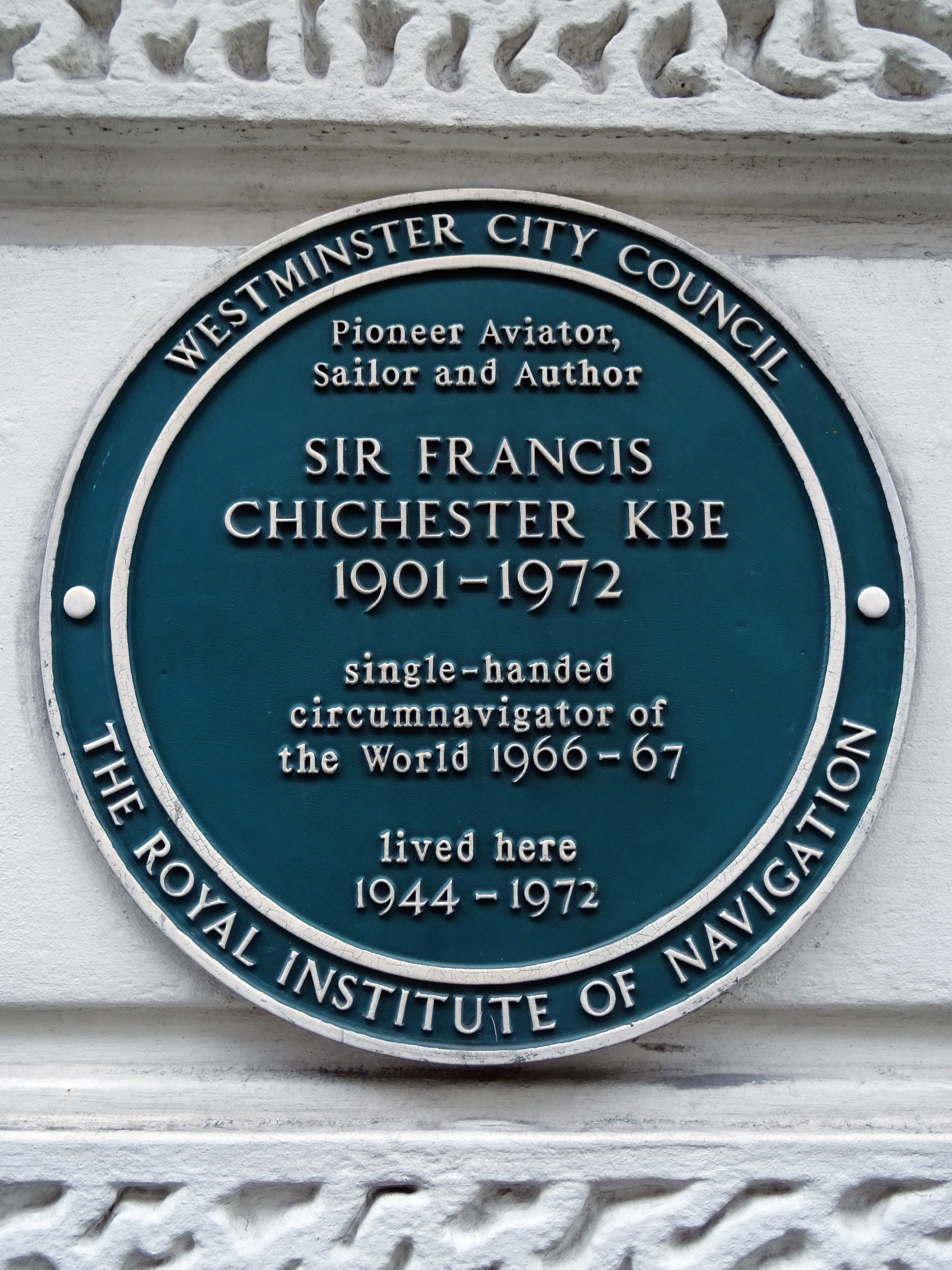
A Plaque sponsored by the RIN to Sir Francis Chichester, a past recipient of the Harold Spencer-Jones Gold Medal

The institute presents a number of awards to individuals and organisations that have contributed to the advancement of navigation and its associated sciences:

- The Harold Spencer-Jones Gold Medal is the institute's highest award and is awarded in recognition to those making an outstanding contribution to navigation. Examples of past recipients include P. V. H. Weems, Sir Francis Chichester, Sir Robin Knox-Johnston and current Director of the RIN Ramsey Faragher.
- The JED Williams Medal is awarded to individuals making an outstanding contribution to the affairs of the institute.
- The Michael Richey Medal is awarded to the authors of the best paper in each volume of the institute's Journal of Navigation.
- The Duke of Edinburgh's Navigation Award (formerly the institute's Technical Excellence Award) is awarded to individuals or organisations for outstanding technical achievement. Examples of past recipients include the National Air Traffic Services and NASA.

Nomination guidance for the various awards is provided on the institute's website.

The institute offers a number of scholarships to assist in the education and development of its younger members.

== Library ==
The institute houses the Cundall Library of Navigation at its offices in London. The Cundall Library of Navigation, the UK's leading navigation-specific library of books and resources, from which members may borrow, is also open to the public.

== Publications ==
The institute regularly issues two leading publications in print edition as well as online:

- The Journal of Navigation is published six times a year by Cambridge University Press. It contains papers which have been presented at meetings, other original papers and selected papers and reports from the institute's Special Interest Groups.
- Navigation News is published six times a year by the institute and contains a full accounts of the institute's proceedings and activities, including a record of current navigational work, a diary of events, topical articles, news, membership, and advertising.
