= Richard Nelmes =

British crystallographer

Richard Nelmes OBE FRS FRSE
- Education: University of Cambridge
- Known for: High-pressure crystallography
- Awards: Duddell Medal; 2007
- Scientific career
- Fields: Crystallography
- Workplaces: University of Edinburgh; Rutherford Appleton Laboratory
- Doctoral advisor: William Cochran
- Website: Official website

Richard John Nelmes (born 1943) is a British crystallographer, currently professor emeritus and Honorary Professorial Fellow in the School of Physics and Astronomy at the University of Edinburgh. As chair of the university's Centre for Science at Extreme Conditions (CSEC), he studies the behaviour of crystal structures and materials such as ice, methane, and silicon at pressures of up to 1 million times normal atmospheric pressure.

== Early life and career ==
Nelmes graduated from the University of Cambridge, before moving to the University of Edinburgh, where he took a PhD supervised by William Cochran.

== Research interests ==
At the Edinburgh University Centre for Science at Extreme Conditions, Nelmes' research looks at how extreme pressures can change the properties of existing materials or create entirely new ones. This work has many industrial applications, from creating new superconductors to cooking foods using pressure instead of heat. Nelmes also works at the Rutherford Appleton Laboratory where he helped to establish the Diamond Light Source X-ray synchrotron and has pioneered high-pressure X-ray diffraction.

== Awards ==
Nelmes received an OBE in 2000 for his scientific research. He was elected a Fellow of the Royal Society of Edinburgh in 1995 and a Fellow of the Royal Society in 2003. In 2007, he received the Duddell Medal from the Institute of Physics for "pioneering new techniques and instrumentation that have transformed high-pressure structural science, including the production of quantitative diffraction data that can be analysed to pressures beyond a megabar".

== Selected publications ==
- McMahon M.I., Nelmes R.J. (2006). "High-pressure structures and phase transformations in elemental metals". Chem Soc Rev. 35 (10): 943–63. doi:10.1039/b517777b. PMID 17003900.
- Loveday, J.S.; Nelmes, R.J. (2008). "High-pressure gas hydrates". Phys. Chem. Chem. Phys. 10 (7): 937–950. Bibcode:2008PCCP...10..937L. doi:10.1039/B704740A. hdl:1842/3987. PMID 18259632.
