= Cecil Reginald Burch =

British physicist and engineer

Cecil Reginald Burch, FRS FRAS (12 May 1901 – 19 July 1983) was a British physicist and engineer.

He was born in Leeds. He graduated from Gonville and Caius College, Cambridge in 1923 and began research at the Metropolitan-Vickers company in Trafford Park, Manchester. There he developed 'apiezon' oils which enabled high vacua to be achieved, making possible the coating of astronomical mirrors. In 1933, he was made Fellow of Optics at Imperial College London and in 1935, moved to University of Bristol as a research Fellow in the Department of Physics. There he concentrated on the development of microscopy and telescopy.

He won the 1942 Duddell Medal and Prize and the 1954 Rumford Medal, the latter 'For his distinguished contributions to the technique for the production of high vacua and to the development of the reflecting microscope'.

He was elected a Fellow of the Royal Astronomical Society on 10 May 1935. He married Enid G Morice in 1937. He was also elected a Fellow of the Royal Society in 1944.
