= SIMPLE (dark matter experiment) =

Experimental search for dark matter

SIMPLE (Superheated Instrument for Massive ParticLe Experiments) is an experiment search for direct evidence of dark matter. It is located in a 61 m^{3} cavern at the 500 level of the Laboratoire Souterrain à Bas Bruit (LSBB) near Apt in southern France. The experiment is predominantly sensitive to spin-dependent interactions of weakly interacting massive particles (or WIMPs).

SIMPLE is an international collaboration with members from Portugal, France, and the United States.

== Design ==
The SIMPLE detector is based on superheated droplet detectors (SDDs), a suspension of 1–2% superheated liquid C_{2}ClF_{5} droplets (~30 μm radius) in a viscoelastic 900 ml gel matrix, which undergo transitions to the gas phase upon energy deposition by incident radiation. The refrigerant, freon, is used as the active mass.

In effect, each droplet behaves as a miniature bubble chamber. Once a nucleation has occurred, the acoustic shock wave is picked up by microphones. Each acquired signal is then fully discriminated in terms of acoustic external noise, gel-associated noise and most recently particle discrimination. The detectors are typically operated at ~200 kPa and ~280 K. Due to the construction technique, SSDs are almost insensitive to background radiation, and their sensitivity can be adjusted by controlling the temperature and pressure of each device.

== Results ==
The final phase II analysis was published in Physical Review Letters in 2012. Spin-dependeant cross section limits were set for light WIMPs.
