= Stephen Myers (engineer) =

Electronic engineer

Stephen Myers OBE FREng
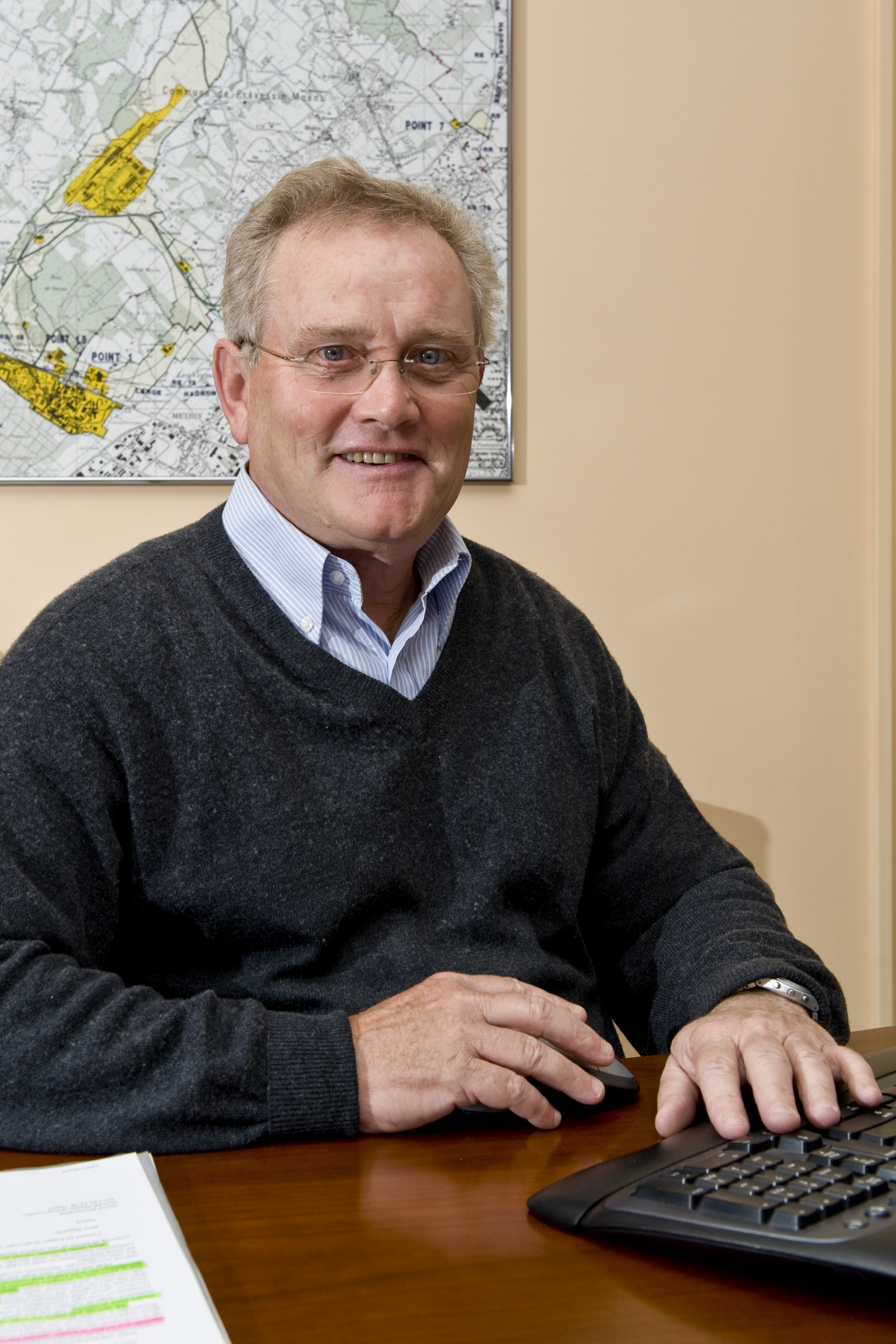
- Stephen Myers during his term of Office as Director of Accelerators and Technology in 2014

CERN Director of Accelerators and Technology
- In office 2009–2014

Personal details
- Born: 3 August 1946 (age 80)
- Education: Queen's University Belfast

Stephen Myers OBE FREng (born 3 August 1946) is an electronic engineer who works in high-energy physics.

== Life ==
Myers earned a bachelor's degree in electrical and electronic engineering in 1968 from Queen's University, Belfast, and completed his Ph.D. there in 1972. Thereafter he worked at CERN. He co-led the commissioning and performance of the Large Electron Positron Collider (LEP) and later was appointed project leader for the LEP-2 energy upgrade. Following the LHC technical failure in September 2008, he was appointed CERN Director of Accelerators and Technology (2009-2014) and in this capacity directed the post-accident repair of the LHC and the accelerator performance until 2014. In 2012 the LHC experiments ATLAS and CMS announced the discovery of the Higgs' boson. In 2014, he was appointed Head of CERN Medical Applications.

He has been awarded honorary doctorates by the University of Geneva in 2001, by Queen’s University, Belfast in 2003, and by Dublin City University in 2017. In 2013 Queen's University, Belfast named him an honorary professor. He was elected as a fellow of the Institute of Physics in 2003, and of the Royal Academy of Engineering in 2012. He became an honorary member of the European Physical Society in 2013, and of the Royal Irish Academy in 2015.

He was awarded the Duddell Medal and Prize of the Institute of Physics in 2003. In 2010 he was awarded the International Particle Accelerators Lifetime Achievement Prize "for his numerous outstanding contributions to the design, construction, commissioning, performance optimization, and upgrade of energy-frontier colliders - in particular ISR, LEP, and LHC - and to the wider development of accelerator science". With two other CERN directors he was jointly awarded the EPS Edison Volta Prize in 2012. He became an Officer of the Order of the British Empire in 2013.
