= Dennis Gabor Medal and Prize =

Institute of Physics award

- Sponsored by: Institute of Physics
- Formerly called: Duddell Medal and Prize
- Rewards: Silver medal, £1000
- First award: 1923
- Website: http://www.iop.org/about/awards/

The Dennis Gabor Medal and Prize (previously the Duddell Medal and Prize until 2008) is a prize awarded biannually by the Institute of Physics for distinguished contributions to the application of physics in an industrial, commercial or business context. The medal is made of silver and is accompanied by a prize and a certificate.

The original Duddell award was instituted by the Council of The Physical Society in 1923 to the memory of William du Bois Duddell, the inventor of the electromagnetic oscillograph. Between 1961 and 1975 it was awarded in alternate odd-numbered years and thereafter annually.

In 2008 the award was renamed in honour of Dennis Gabor, the Hungarian – British physicist who developed holography, for which he received the 1971 Nobel Prize in Physics. The prize also switched to being awarded in alternate even-numbered years.

== Gabor Medallists ==
The following have been awarded the Gabor Medal and Prize:

- 2026 Darran Milne
- 2024 Michael Jurgen Kosch
- 2023 Ramsey Faragher
- 2021 Athanasia Tzelepi
- 2020 David Birch
- 2019 Kai Bongs
- 2018 Nils Hempler
- 2017 Paul Evans
- 2016 Martin Dawson
- 2014 Brian Keith Tanner
- 2012 Alwyn Seeds
- 2010 Pratibha L Gai
- 2008 Doreen Stoneham

== Duddell Medallists ==
The following have been awarded the Duddell Medal and Prize:

- 2007 Richard Nelmes
- 2006 Peter Wells
- 2005 Geoff Hall, Peter Sharp and Alessandro Marchioro
- 2004 James Hough
- 2003 Stephen Myers
- 2002 Federico Capasso
- 2001 James Kazimierz Gimzewski
- 2000 Ondrej L Krivanek
- 1999 Rex Watton
- 1998 Meirion Francis Lewis
- 1997 Timothy Berners-Lee
- 1996 Martin Pengton Seah
- 1995 Alfred Rodney Adams
- 1994 Christopher John Stokes Damerell
- 1993 Michael Anthony Flemming
- 1992 Peter Faraday Smith
- 1991 Kenneth Firth and David Jonathan Hubbard
- 1990 John Edwin Field
- 1989 Michael J Downs
- 1988 Peter Mansfield
- 1987 Colin George Windsor
- 1986 Bryan Peter Kibble
- 1985 Colin Edward Webb
- 1984 Peter George LeComber
- 1983 Ian Robert Young
- 1982 Simon van der Meer
- 1981 Bruce Arthur Joyce
- 1980 Albert Victor Crewe
- 1979 John Riddle Sandercock
- 1978 Edward George Sydney Paige
- 1977 Ronald Ferguson Pearson
- 1976 Godfrey Newbold Hounsfield
- 1975 Ernst Ruska
- 1973 Albert Franks
- 1971 Vernon Ellis Cosslett and Kenneth Charles Arthur Smith
- 1969 Charles William Oatley
- 1967 Keith Davy Froome and Robert Howard Bradsell
- 1965 Hugh Alastair Gebbie
- 1963 Bertram Neville Brockhouse
- 1961 John Bertram Adams
- 1960 Reginald Victor Jones
- 1959 George William Hutchinson and Gordon George Scarrott
- 1958 Leonard Charles Jackson
- 1957 Charles Eryl Wynn-Williams
- 1956 John Gilbert Daunt
- 1955 Rudolf Kompfner
- 1954 Alfred Charles Bernard Lovell
- 1953 William Sucksmith
- 1952 Cecil Waller
- 1951 Albert Beaumont Wood
- 1950 Donald William Fry
- 1949 Edwin Herbert Land
- 1948 Karl Manne Georg Siegbahn
- 1947 Robert Jemison Van de Graaff
- 1946 Karl Weissenberg
- 1945 John Turton Randall
- 1944 Francis William Aston
- 1943 John Guild
- 1942 Cecil Reginald Burch
- 1941 William David Coolidge
- 1940 Ernest Orlando Lawrence
- 1938 Robert William Paul
- 1937 Hans Geiger
- 1936 Walter Guyton Cady
- 1935 Charles Vickery Drysdale
- 1934 W Ewart Williams
- 1933 Harold Dennis Taylor
- 1932 Wolfgang Gaede
- 1931 Charles Thomson Rees Wilson
- 1930 John Ambrose Fleming
- 1929 Albert Abraham Michelson
- 1928 Charles Édouard Guillaume
- 1927 Frank Edward Smith
- 1926 Frank Twyman
- 1925 Albert Campbell
- 1924 Charles Vernon Boys
- 1923 Hugh Longbourne Callendar

== See also ==
- Institute of Physics Awards
- List of physics awards
- List of awards named after people
