= Microcosm (CERN) =

Museum at CERN in Meyrin (Switzerland)

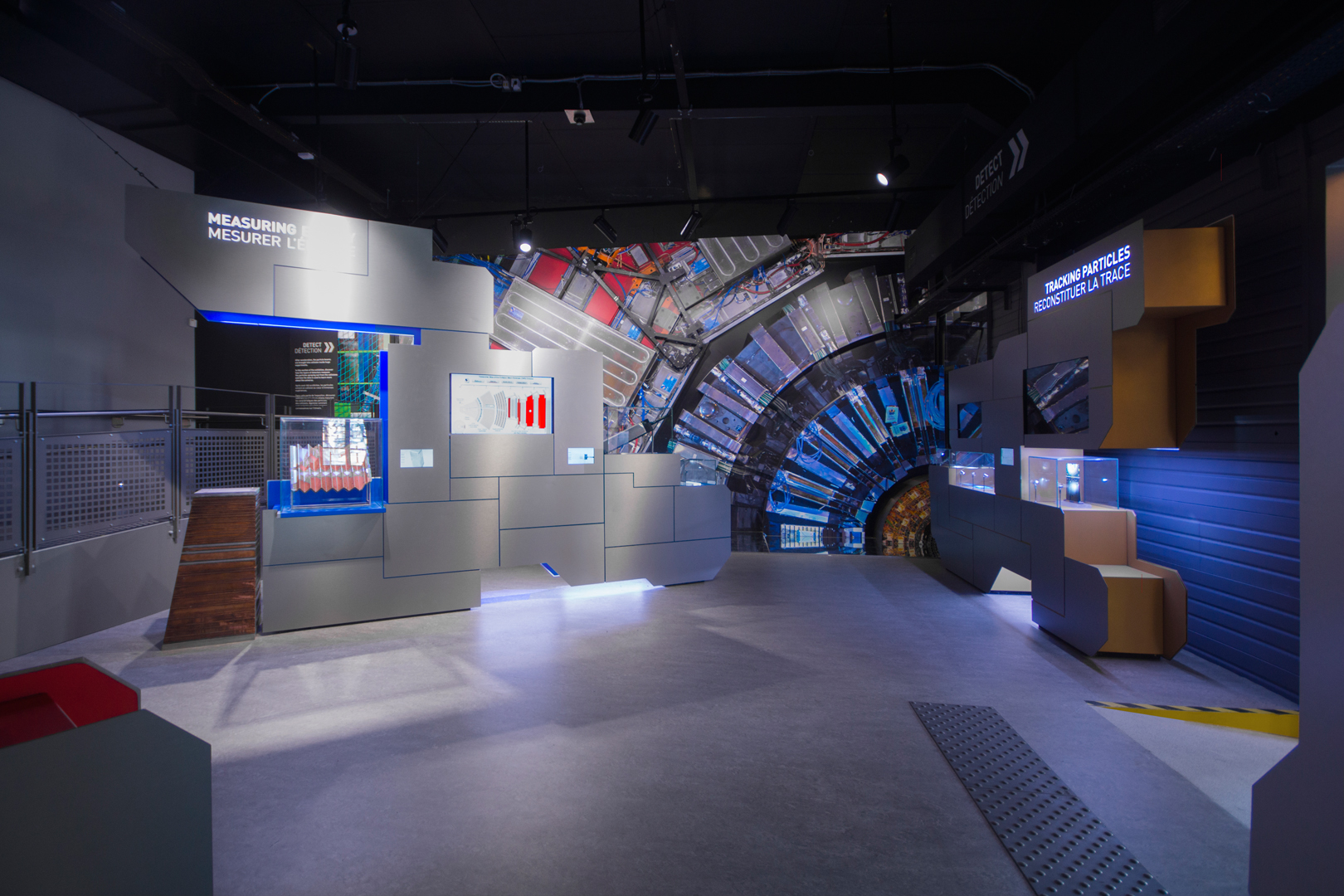
Microcosm exhibition at CERN

Microcosm or CERN Museum was an interactive exhibition presenting the work of the CERN particle physics laboratory and its flagship accelerator the Large Hadron Collider (LHC). It first opened to the public in 1990 and closed permanently in September 2022, to be replaced by the CERN Science Gateway in 2023. The final version of the exhibition opened in January 2016, developed by CERN in collaboration with Spanish design team Indissoluble.

== History ==
The project was approved by the CERN Directorate in February 1988. The initial construction, to a large extent completed in 1989, was financed through contributions from the Canton of Geneva, the Swiss Confederation, neighbouring France, banks, and industrial firms.

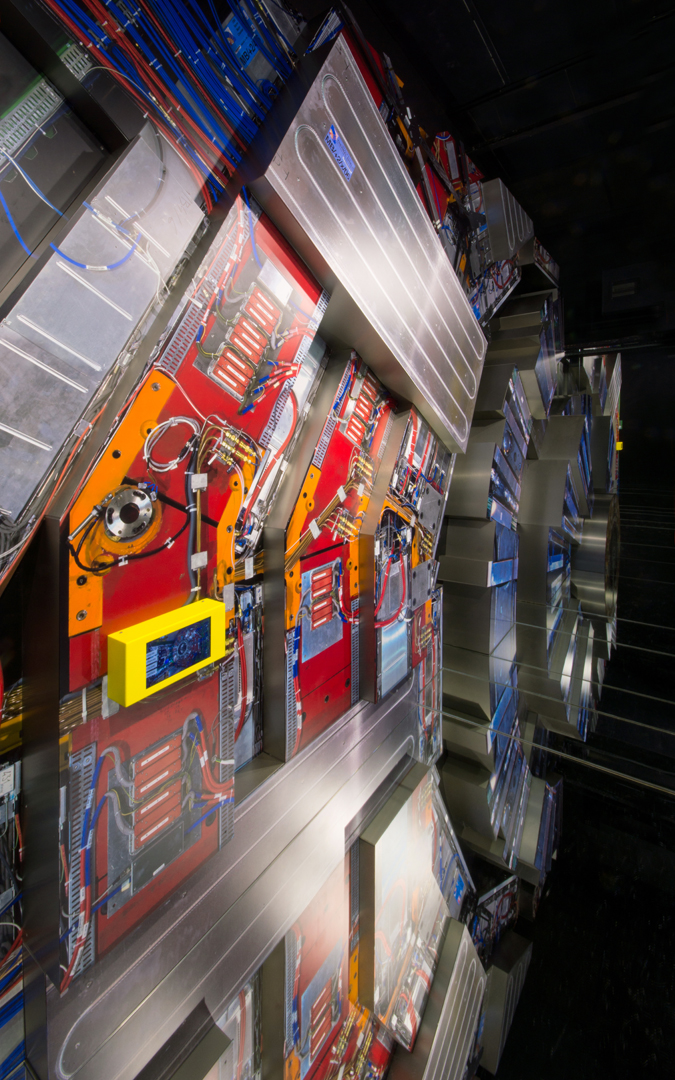
CMS life-size model

== Main exhibits ==
The exhibition displayed many real objects, taking visitors on a journey through CERN's key installations, from the hydrogen bottle, source of the protons that are injected into the LHC, through the first step in the accelerator chain, the linac, on to a model of a section of the Large Hadron Collider including elements from the superconducting magnets. Visitors could interact with the displays to try their hand at the controls of a particle accelerator – simulating the acceleration of protons in the LHC and bringing them into collision inside the experiments.

The exhibition contained a 1:1 scale model of a complete slice through the CMS experiment at the LHC. The computing section displayed some of the Oracle data tapes used to store the 30-40 petabytes of data produced yearly by the experiments, made available for analysis using the LHC Computing GRID. The annex to the exhibition contained other historical artifacts such as the central tracker from the UA1 detector, which ran at the Super Proton Synchrotron at CERN from 1981 to 1984, and helped discover the W and Z bosons.

== Special projects ==
A project began in 2013 to preserve the original hardware and software associated with the birth of the World Wide Web. This effort coincided with the 20th anniversary of the research center giving the web to the world.

== Microcosm garden ==
The Microcosm garden is named Léon Van Hove Square in honour of CERN's Research Director-General from 1976 to 1980. The garden features several large components of old CERN experiments.

The garden view

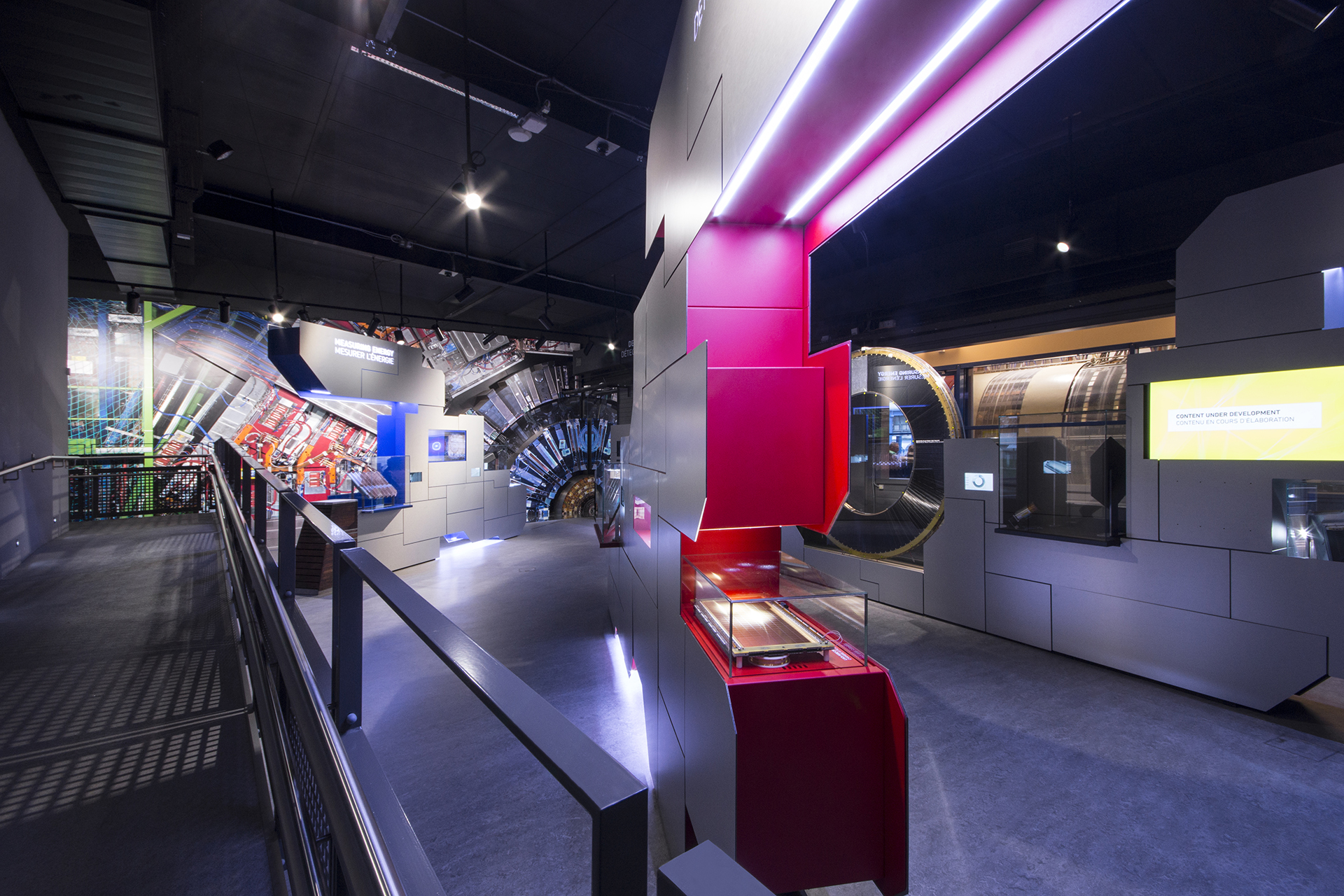
General view of the Detectors room

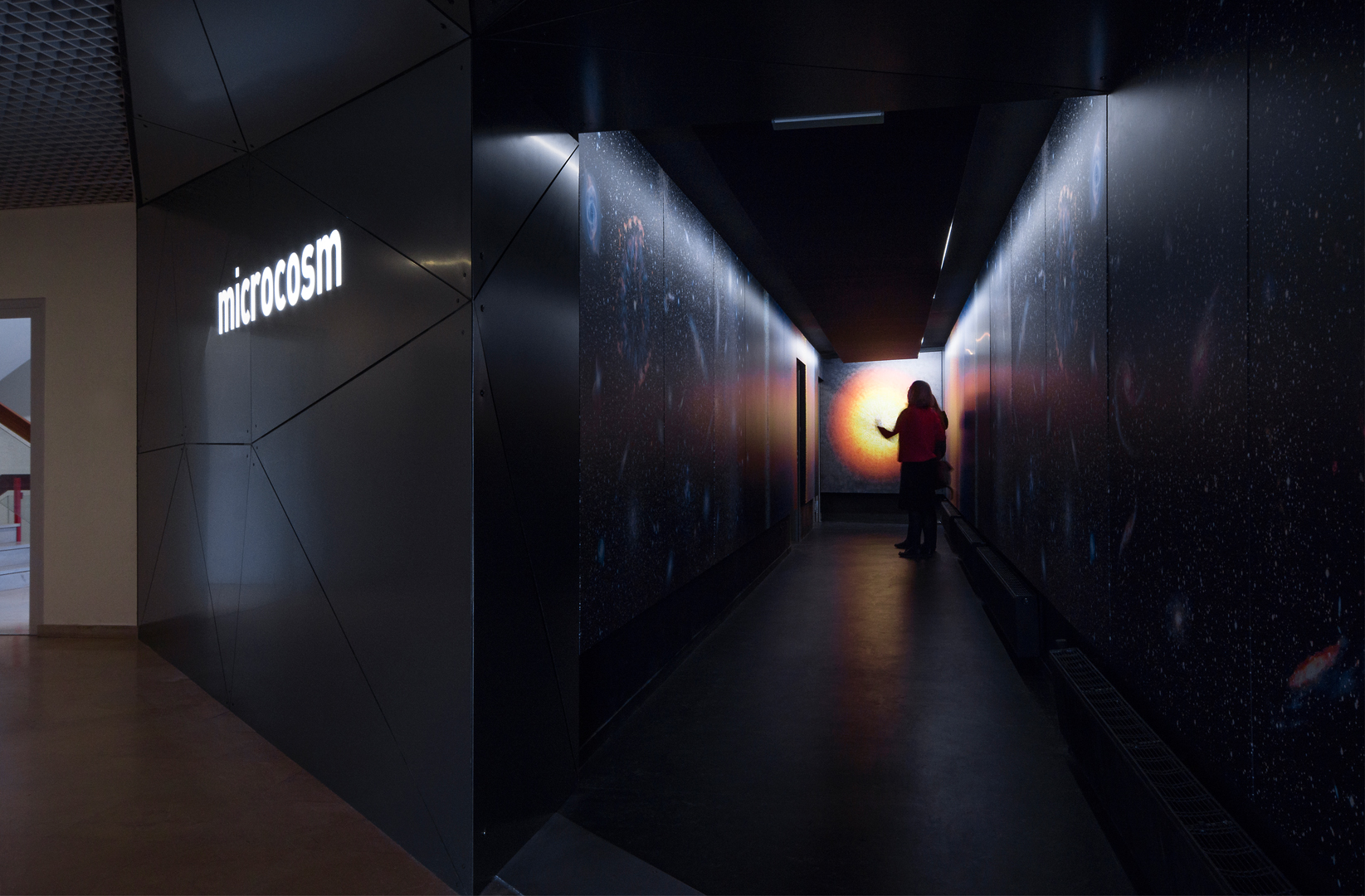
Entrance to the exhibition

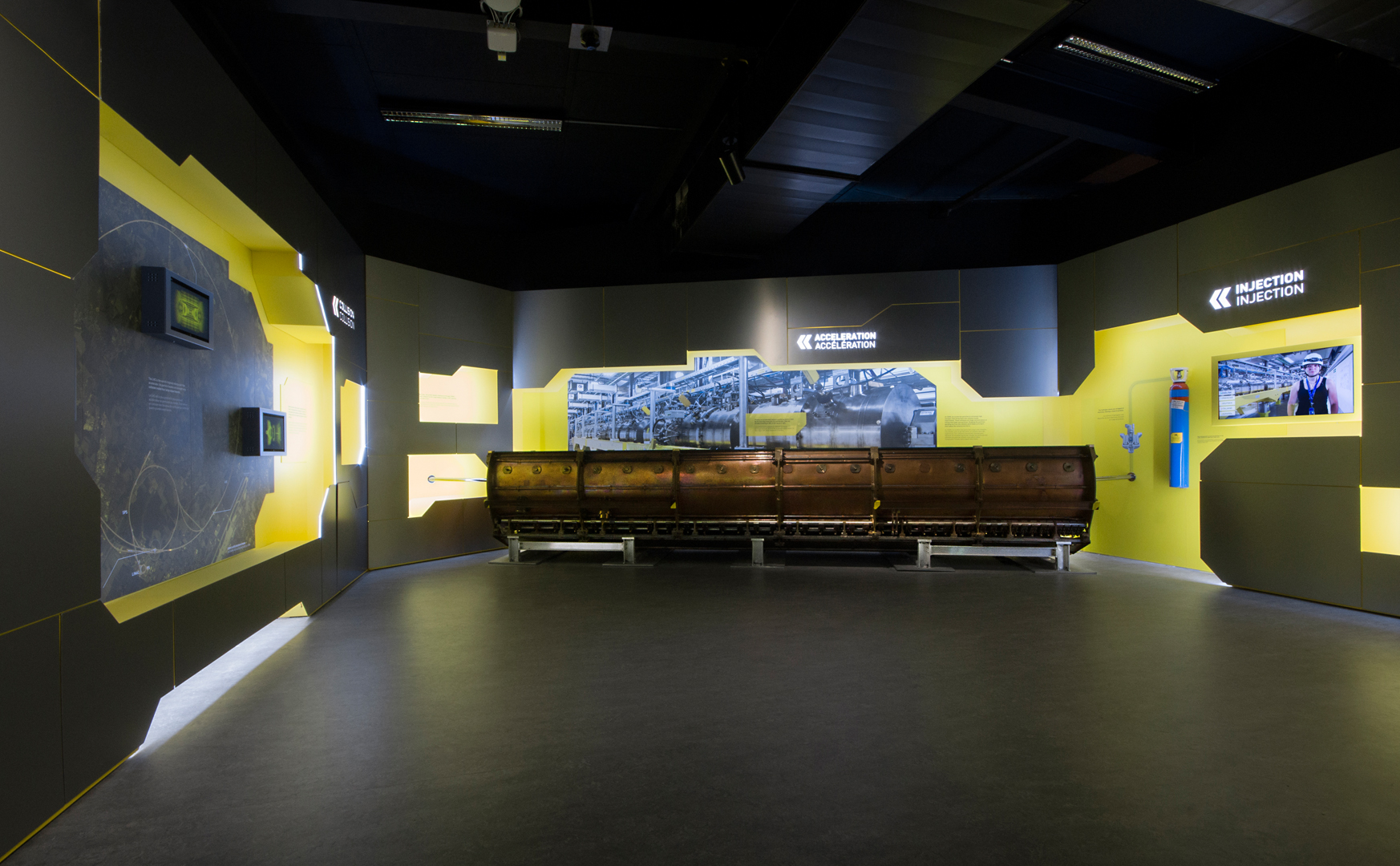
Introduction to the particles room

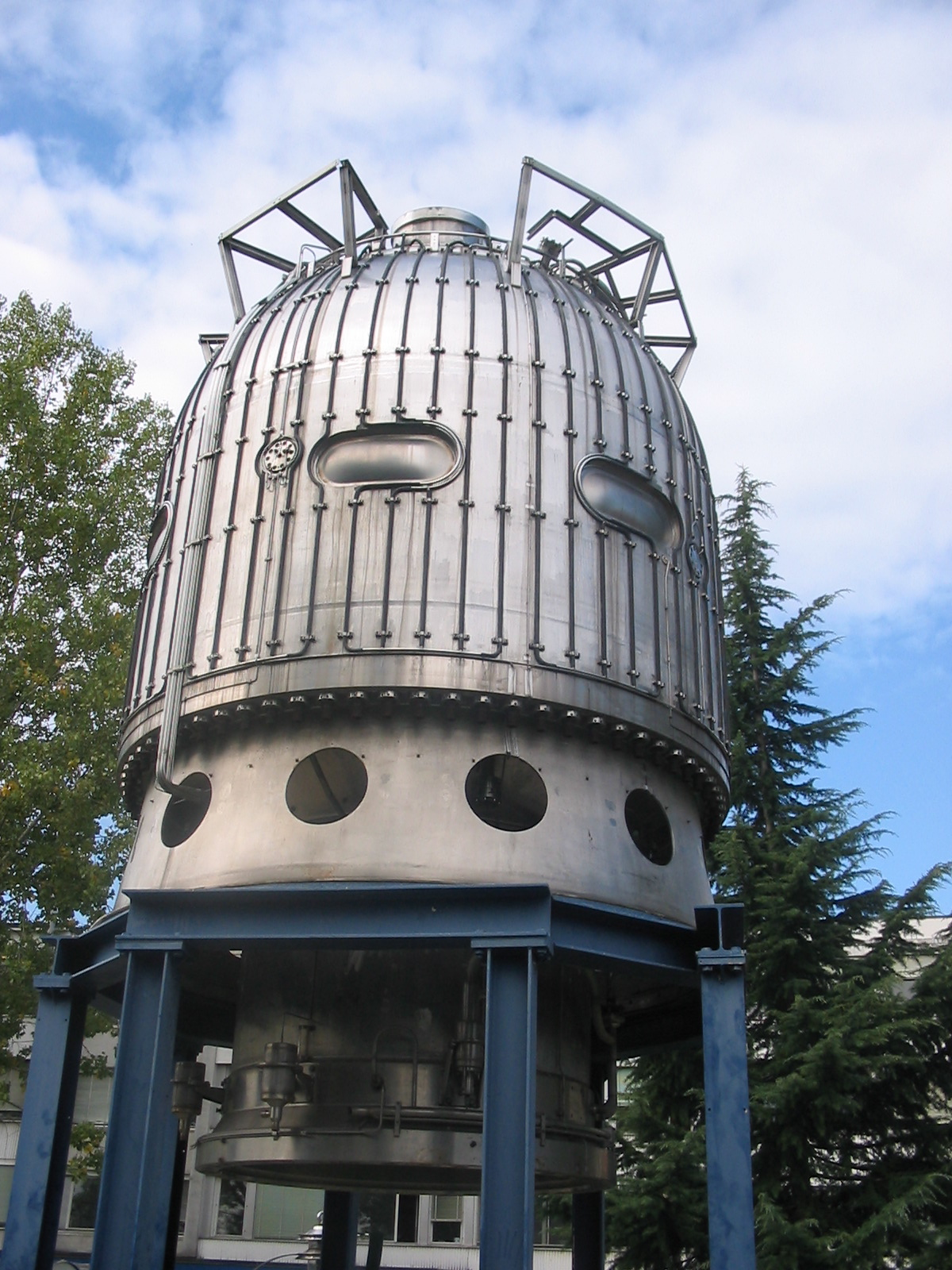
The Big European Bubble Chamber

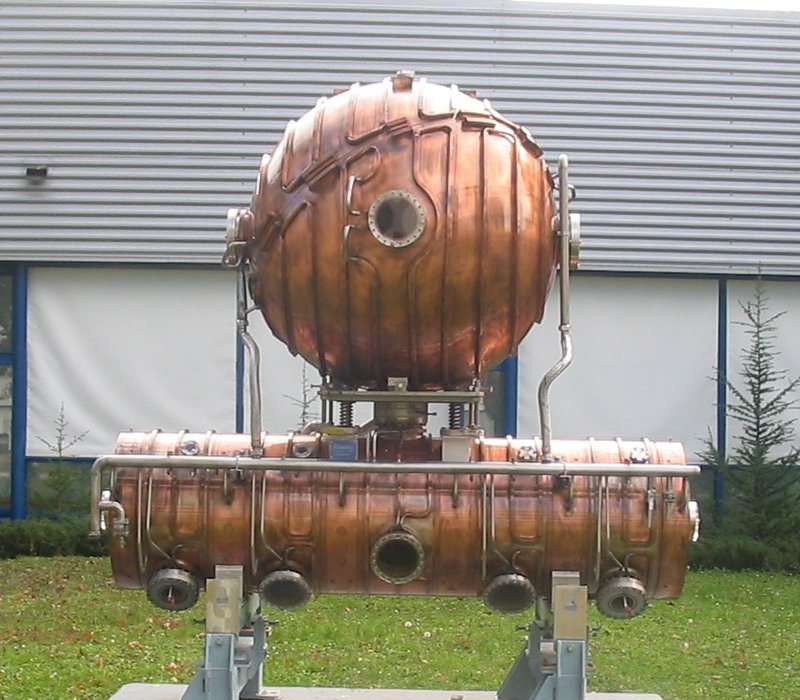
An RF cavity from the Large Electron–Positron Collider

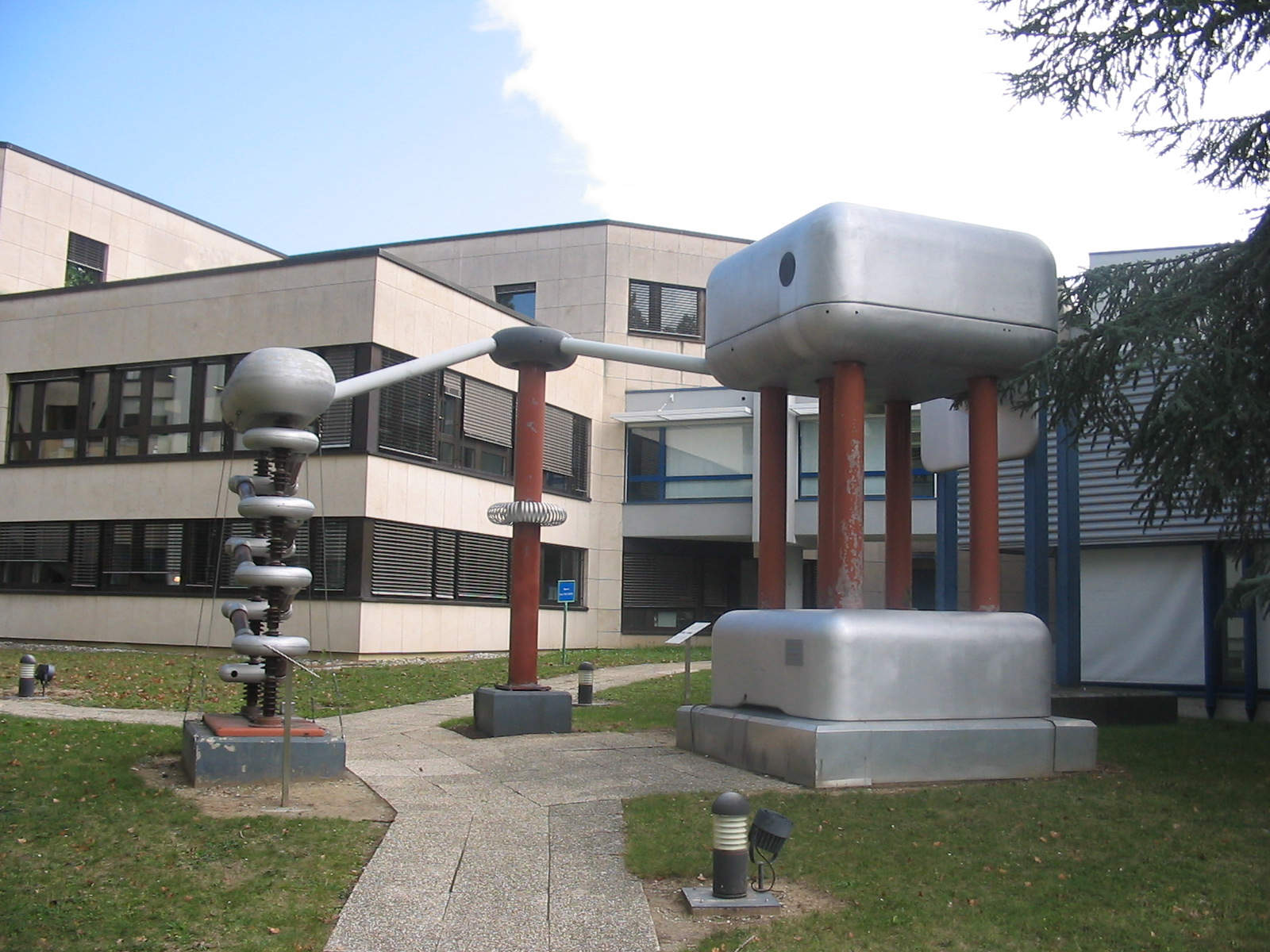
Initial stages of an old particle accelerator

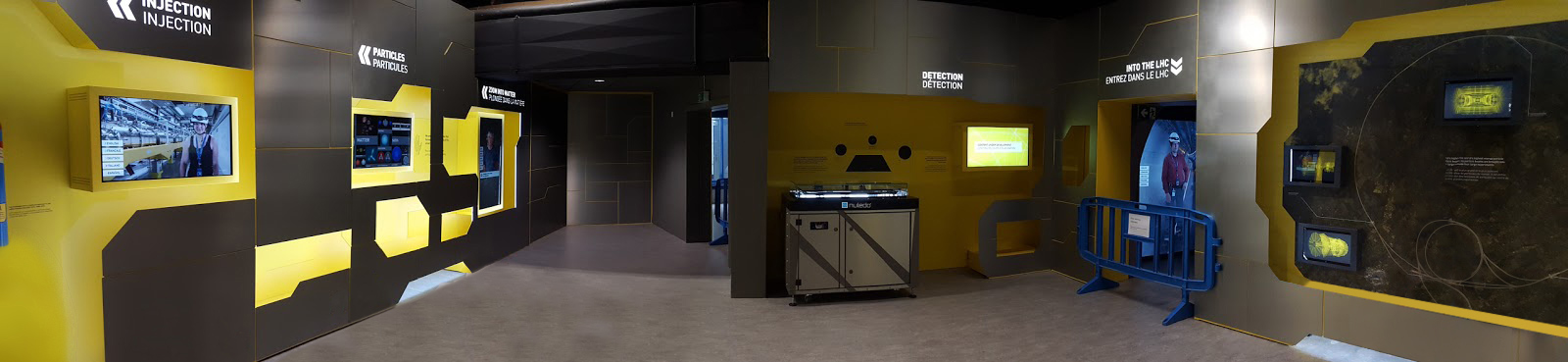
Particles room also features an interactive cloud chamber - device capable of displaying normally undetectable traces of radiation

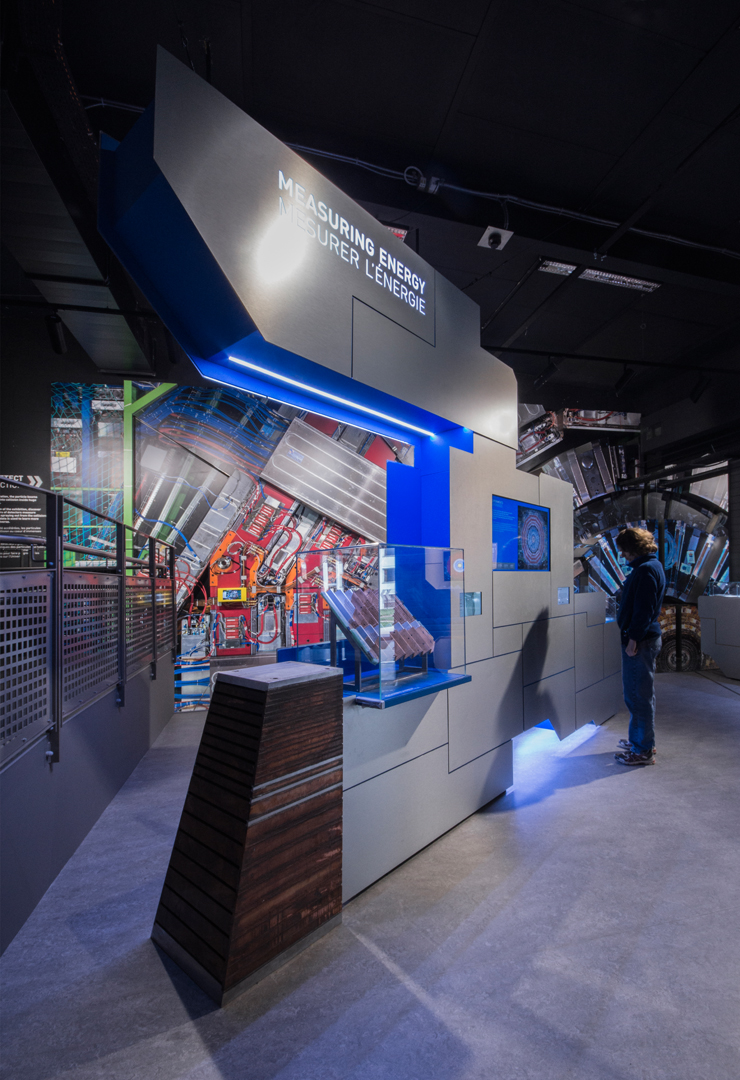
Measuring energy detector

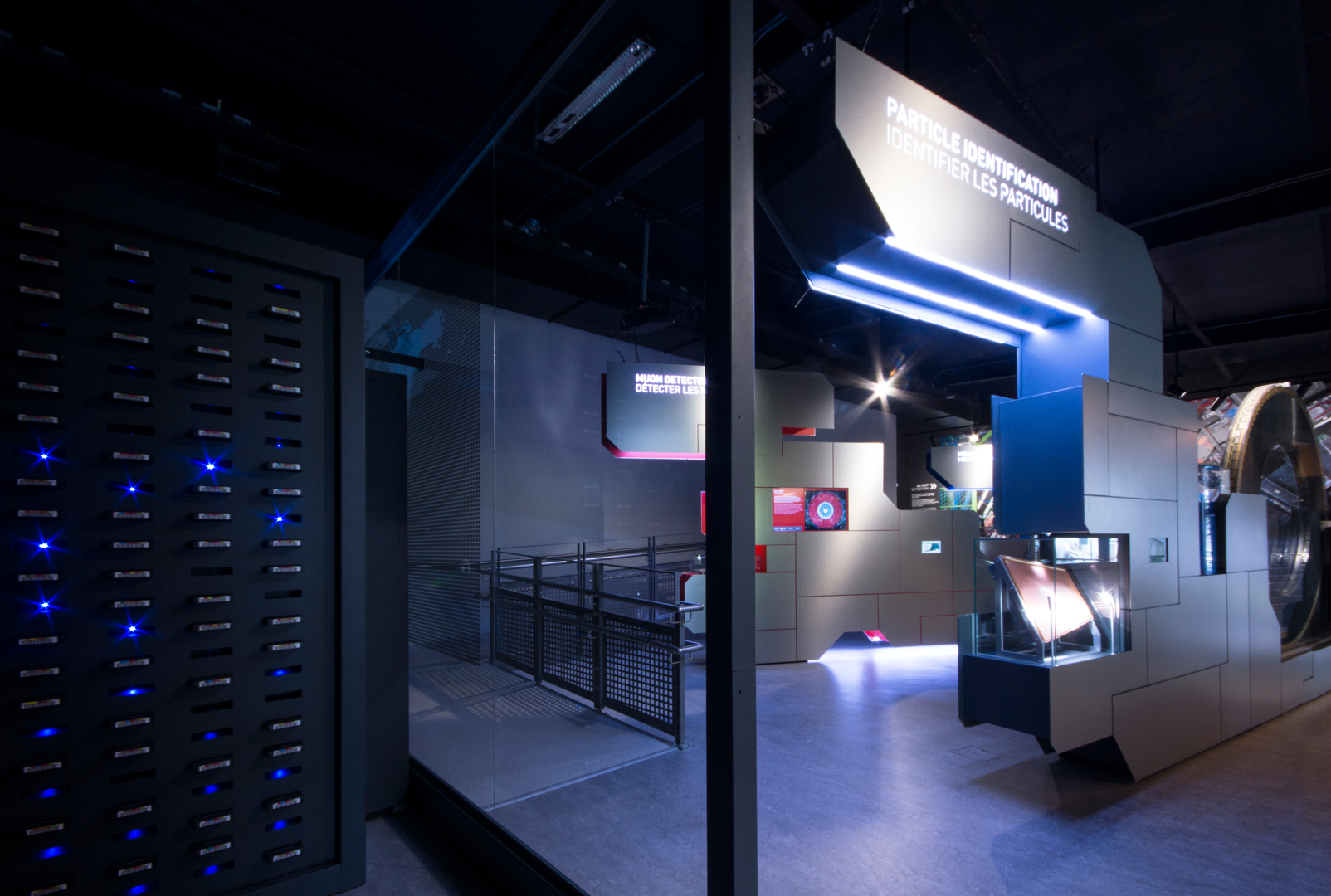
Detectors room

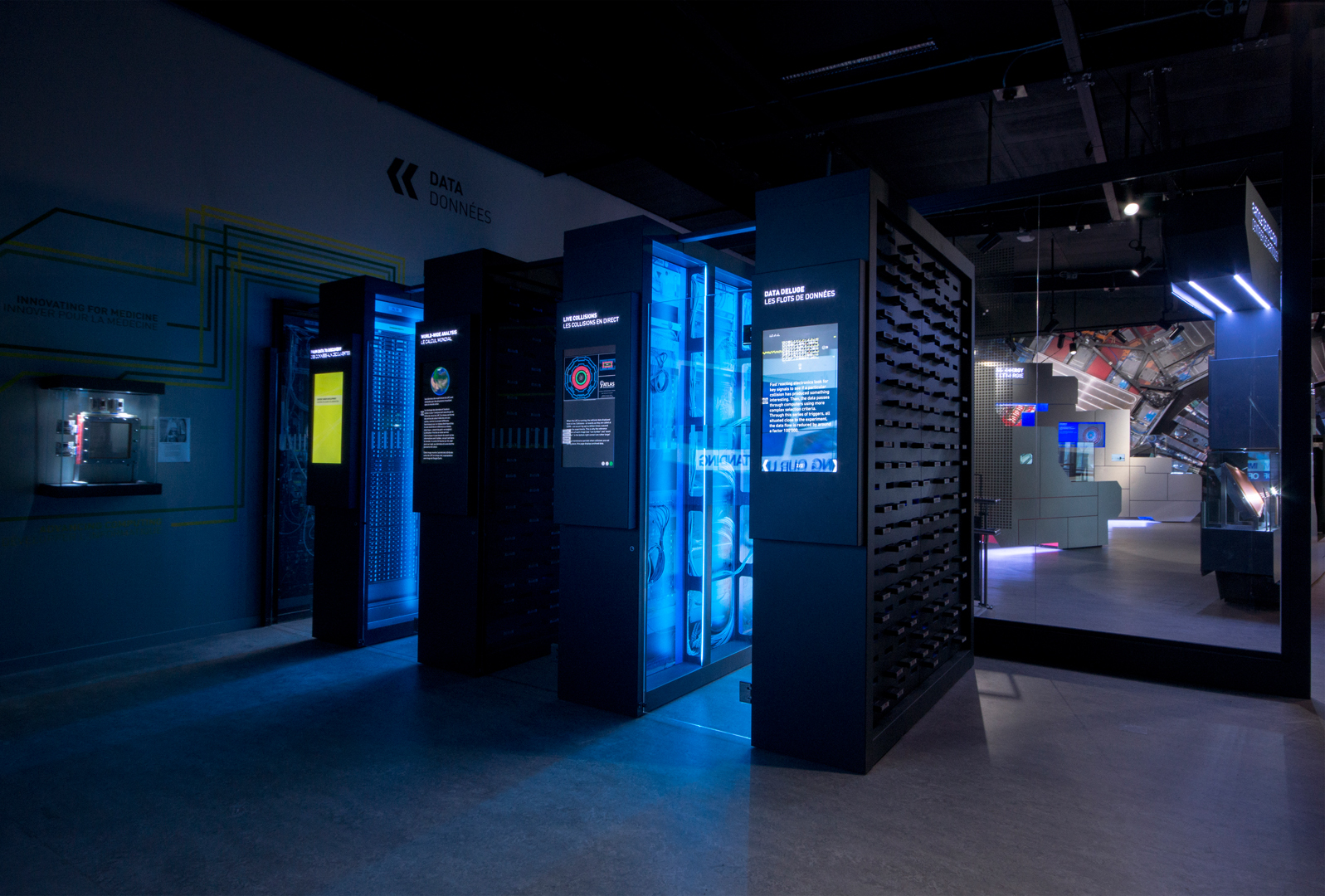
DATA room

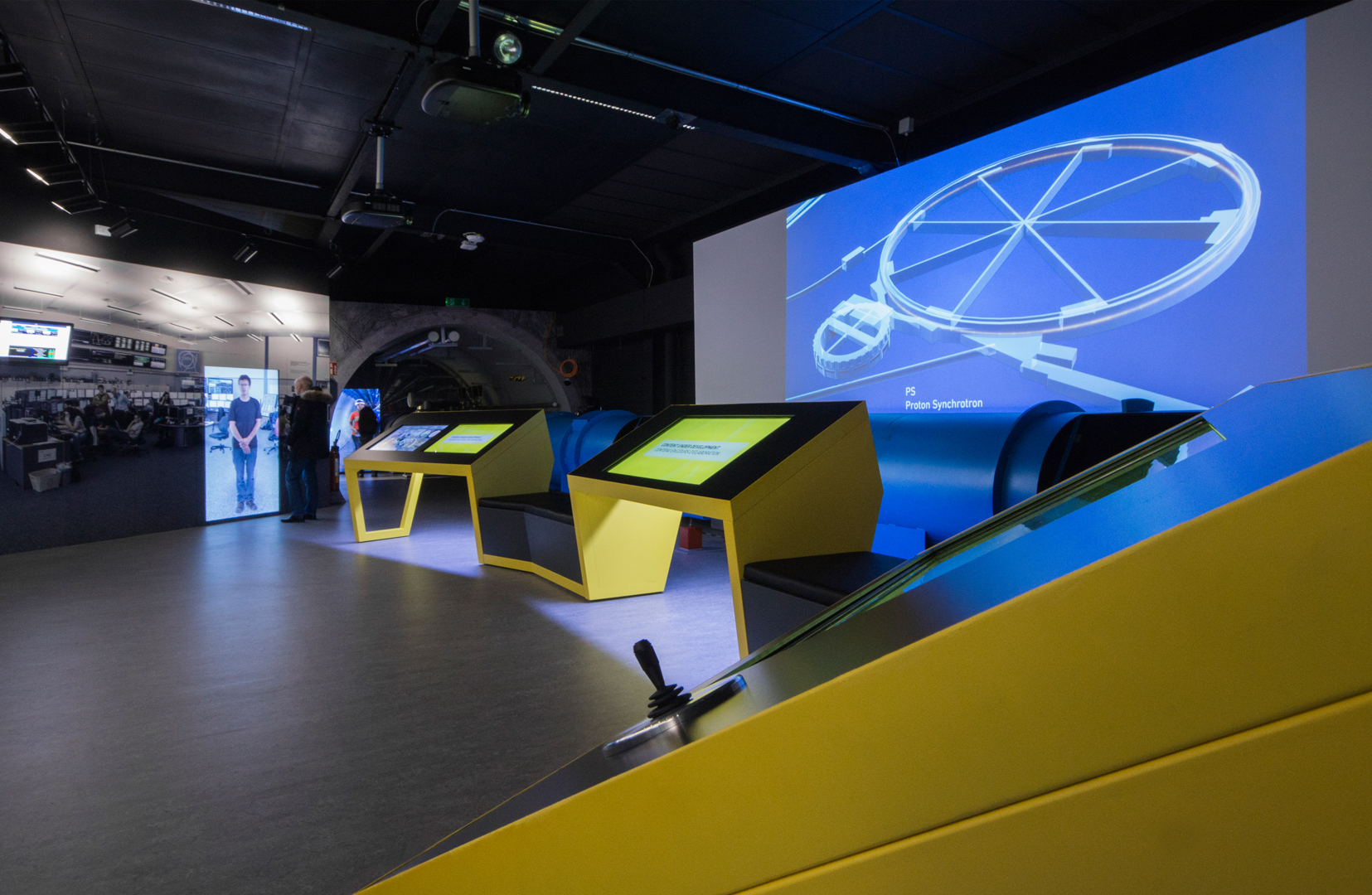
LHC control room

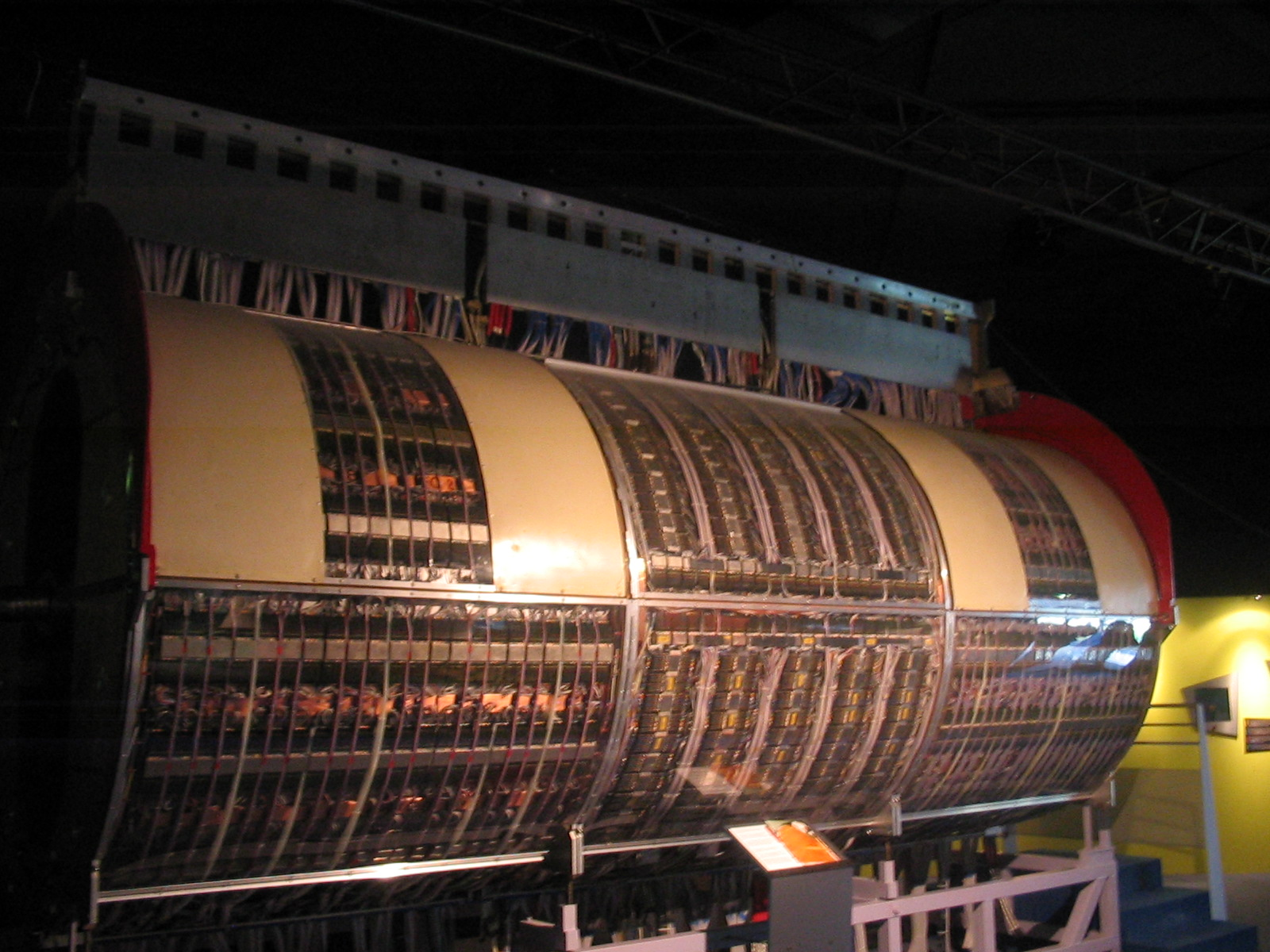
The central section of the UA1 experiment on display at the Microcosm museum

== Location ==
Microcosm was located at CERN in the Canton of Geneva, Switzerland, near the town of Meyrin. Entrance was free, without reservation, open 6 days a week.

== See also ==
- List of museums in Switzerland
