= Pratibha Gai =

British microscopist

Dame Pratibha Gai-Boyes
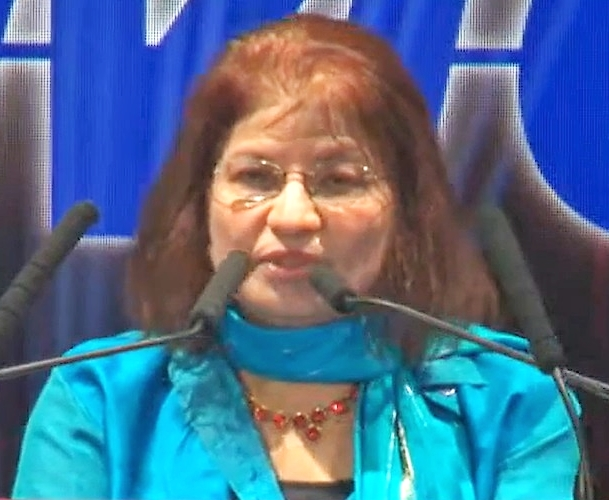
- Pratibha Gai at The Asian Awards in 2016
- Born: Pratibha Laxman Gai
- Education: University of Cambridge
- Awards: Gabor Medal and Prize (2010); Fellow of the Institute of Physics; Fellow of the Royal Society of Chemistry; L'Oréal-UNESCO Awards for Women in Science (2013); Fellow of the Royal Academy of Engineering (2014); Fellow of the Royal Society (2016); Honorary Fellow of the Royal Microscopical Society (2018)
- Scientific career
- Workplaces: University of York; University of Delaware; University of Oxford; DuPont
- Thesis: Applications of Weak Beam Electron Microscopy (1974)
- Website: york.ac.uk/physics/people/gai

Dame Pratibha Laxman Gai-Boyes is a British microscopist and Professor and Chair of Electron Microscopy and former Director at The York JEOL Nanocentre, Departments of Chemistry and Physics, University of York. She created the atomic-resolution environmental transmission electron microscope (ETEM) and is an outspoken advocate for women with careers in science.

== Education and early life ==
Gai grew up in India, and was fascinated by science as a child. She was influenced by Marie Curie, her education, and her parents to study chemistry. However, at that time, it was not socially accepted for women to have careers in the physical sciences. When she was a teenager, she was selected as a national science talent search scholar.

“It would have been very difficult without the scholarships because societal expectations for women at that time did not include careers in the sciences or chemistry. I would say that societal expectations, even today, as to what is good for women, including in the UK, do not always include scientific studies."

Gai was educated at the University of Cambridge where she was awarded a PhD in 1974 for research on weak beam electron microscopy conducted in the Cavendish Laboratory.

== Research and career ==
Gai has pioneered advanced in-situ electron microscopy applications in the chemical sciences. With Edward D. Boyes, she co-invented the atomic resolution environmental transmission electron microscope (ETEM), which enables the visualization and analysis on the atomic scale of dynamic gas-catalyst reactions underpinning key chemical processes. Her research has helped to understand better how catalysts function, leading to valuable new science. This invention has helped many scientists. Her microscope and process inventions are being exploited worldwide by microscope manufacturers, chemical companies and researchers.

In 2009, after years of development, Gai, who holds a chair in electron microscopy and was co-director of the York JEOL Nanocentre at the University of York, succeeded in creating a microscope capable of perceiving chemical reactions at the atomic scale.

This is an advance on conventional microscopes at this scale, which can only view innate material in the "dead" conditions of a vacuum at room temperature. It is known as the atomic resolution environmental transmission electron microscope (ETEM).

With the help of colleagues, she built and refined the machine over two decades, beginning with a lower-resolution prototype when she was a postdoctoral researcher at the University of Oxford. She then spent 18 years in the US at chemical firm DuPont and the University of Delaware.

Although her microscope is highly valuable to the scientific field, she made the decision to not patent it, saying, "I thought that if I patented it, no one else would be able to do work with it. I might earn some money, but I was not interested in that. I was interested in applications for many researchers, creating more fundamental science. So I decided not to patent it."

She often advocates for women's roles in science, and has spoken about the challenge of having children as a woman scientist. She says, "what's needed to keep women in science; it's a very competitive field and they [otherwise] lag behind whether they are working or not. So I keep telling my female students to aim high."

== Awards and honours ==
- 2010 Gabor Medal and Prize for in-situ atomic resolution environmental transmission electron microscopy (ETEM).
- Fellow of the Institute of Physics
- Fellow of the Royal Society of Chemistry
- 2013 L'Oréal-UNESCO For Women in Science Awards Laureate for Europe
- 2014 Fellow of the Royal Academy of Engineering
- 2016 Fellow of the Royal Society (FRS)
- 2018 The Asian Awards for Outstanding Achievement in Science & Technology.
- 2018 Dame Commander of the Order of the British Empire For services to Chemical Sciences and Technology
- 2018 Honorary Fellow of the Royal Microscopical Society
