= William Cochran (physicist) =

Scottish physicist

William Cochran FRS FRSE
- Education: University of Edinburgh
- Known for: X-ray crystallography
- Awards: Hughes Medal; 1978: Howard N. Potts Medal 1985
- Scientific career
- Fields: Crystallography
- Workplaces: University of Edinburgh; University of Cambridge
- Doctoral advisor: Arnold Beevers
- Doctoral students: Roger Cowley; Richard Nelmes

William (Bill) Cochran FRS FRSE (30 July 1922 – 28 August 2003) was a Scottish physicist. He is best known for "pioneering contributions to the science of X-ray crystallography", for which he was awarded the Hughes Medal in 1978.

== Biography ==
Bill Cochran was born in Scotland and educated at Boroughmuir High School in Edinburgh. He studied physics at the University of Edinburgh. He completed his PhD under Arnold Beevers in the Chemistry Department in X-ray crystallography of sucrose using isomorphous replacement. He moved to the University of Cambridge to work with Lawrence Bragg, and obtained tenure in 1951. He realised that isomorphous replacement was the key to solving protein structures. With Francis Crick, he invented methods for deducing helical patterns from crystallographic data, which ultimately led to the solution of the structure of DNA.

Cochran went on to study neutron diffraction with Bertram Brockhouse and used lattice dynamics and to explain the phenomenon of ferroelectricity in terms of lattice instabilities. This was tested by his students Stuart Pawley, Roger Cowley and Richard Nelmes. This idea was also advanced around the same time by Philip Anderson, but Cochran credits Chandrasekhara Venkata Raman and Negundagi with the original idea. Cochran's basic idea is that on cooling from a high temperature state, symmetry breaking can occur.

Cochran returned to Edinburgh in 1964 as Chair of Natural Philosophy. His monograph The Dynamics of Atoms in Crystals was published in 1973. He became Head of Department in 1975 and was instrumental in the merger of the Natural Philosophy and Mathematical Physics departments. He was vice-principal from 1984 to 1987.

Cochran also received an Honorary Doctorate from Heriot-Watt University in 1992.

He was elected a Fellow of the Royal Society in March 1962 and won their Hughes Medal in 1978. He won the Howard N. Potts Medal of the Franklin Institute in 1985.

Cochran died from motor neurone disease in 2003.
