= Roger Cowley =

English physicist

- Born: Roger Arthur Cowley; 24 February 1939
- Died: 27 January 2015 (aged 75)
- Education: University of Cambridge (BA, PhD)
- Awards: Fellow of the Royal Society of Edinburgh (1972); Max Born Prize (1973); Fellow of the Royal Society (1978); Fellow of the Institute of Physics (2008)
- Scientific career
- Workplaces: University of Oxford; University of Edinburgh
- Thesis: The lattice dynamics of ionic crystals (1964)
- Doctoral advisor: William Cochran

Roger Arthur Cowley, FRS, FRSE, FInstP (24 February 1939 – 27 January 2015) was an English physicist who specialised in the excitations of solids.

== Biography ==
Cowley was born in Woodford Green, Essex, on 24 February 1939. His father, Cecil Arthur Cowley, was a chartered surveyor, and his mother Mildred Sarah Nash was from a farming family. During World War II, the family evacuated to Leighton Buzzard, Bedfordshire, later moving to Shenfield and on to Gidea Park, Essex. He was educated at Brentwood School, where he had won a scholarship, and afterwards he entered Trinity Hall, Cambridge, where he read natural sciences. Cowley would remain at Cambridge to study for a PhD.

He married Sheila Joyce Wells, a teacher of mathematics, on 4 April 1964 and they had two children. On 27 January 2015 Cowley died at a care home in Oxford as a result of a head injury sustained in a bicycle accident a year earlier.

== Career and research ==
He was appointed professor of physics at the University of Edinburgh in 1970 and Dr Lee's Professor of Experimental Philosophy at the University of Oxford in 1988 (a post that carried with it a fellowship at Wadham College, Oxford). Cowley made his name in the field of neutron scattering. This work led to the study of phase transitions.

== Awards and honours ==
In 1972 Cowley was elected a fellow of the Royal Society of Edinburgh and the following year he was awarded the inaugural Max Born Prize. He was elected Fellow of the Royal Society (FRS) in 1978 and awarded the Fernand Holweck Medal and Prize in 1990. In 2003 he received the Walter Hälg Prize from the European Neutron Scattering Association and the Faraday Medal and Prize from the Institute of Physics in 2008.
