= Berne Infinitesimal Bubble Chamber =

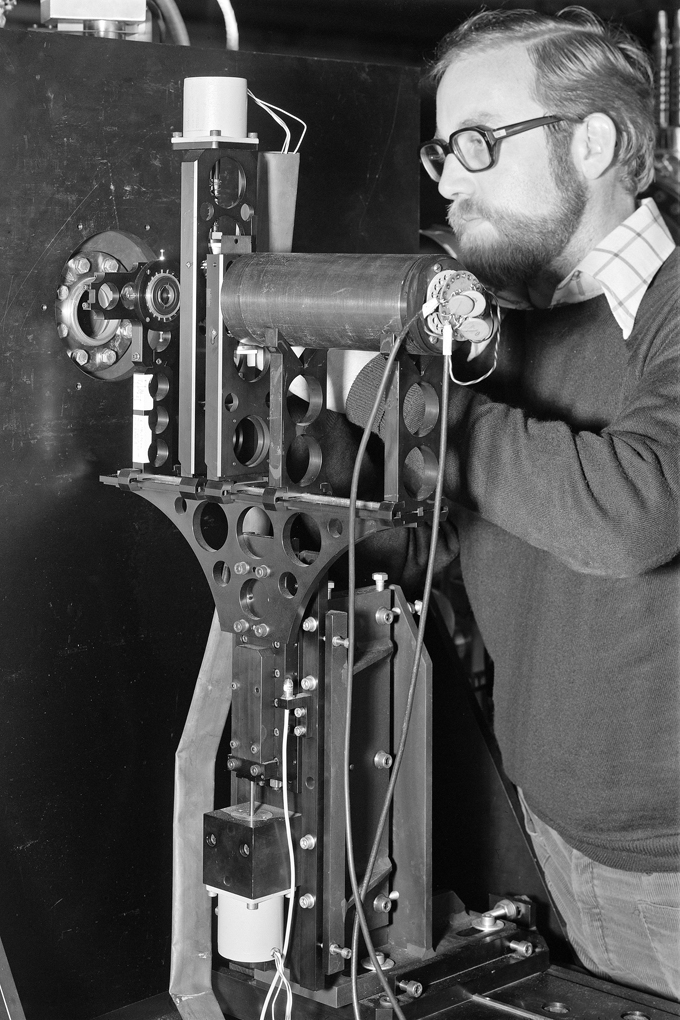
Working with the BIBC chamber at CERN.

The Berne Infinitesimal Bubble Chamber, BIBC, was almost pocket size, 6.5 centimetres across and with a visible volume containing about a wine glass of heavy liquid.

Bubble chambers are similar to cloud chambers, both in application and in basic principle. A chamber is normally made by filling a large cylinder with a liquid heated to just below its boiling point. As particles enter the chamber, a piston suddenly decreases its pressure, and the liquid enters into a superheated, metastable phase. Charged particles create an ionization track, around which the liquid vaporizes, forming microscopic bubbles. Bubble density around a track is proportional to a particle's energy loss. Bubbles grow in size as the chamber expands, until they are large enough to be seen or photographed. Several cameras are mounted around it, allowing a three-dimensional image of an event to be captured.

The BIBC chamber body was machined from a block of aluminium. It was filled with propane or freon. The chamber was designed to look for charmed particles, which are so un-stable that they usually decay too quickly to give big bubble chambers a good chance of catching them. In fact the track of a charmed particle could be lost amongst the 'large' (half a millimetre) bubbles of large chambers. The bubbles in the minichamber were about ten times smaller, and stood a better chance of picking up short tracks. BIBC was used at the CERN SPS in the experiment NA18 as vertex detector together with a downstream 2 m streamer chamber of the MPI-Munich which allowed for momentum analysis of the charged particles.

== See also ==
- Bubble chamber
