= 2 m Bubble Chamber (CERN) =

Particle detector commissioned in 1964

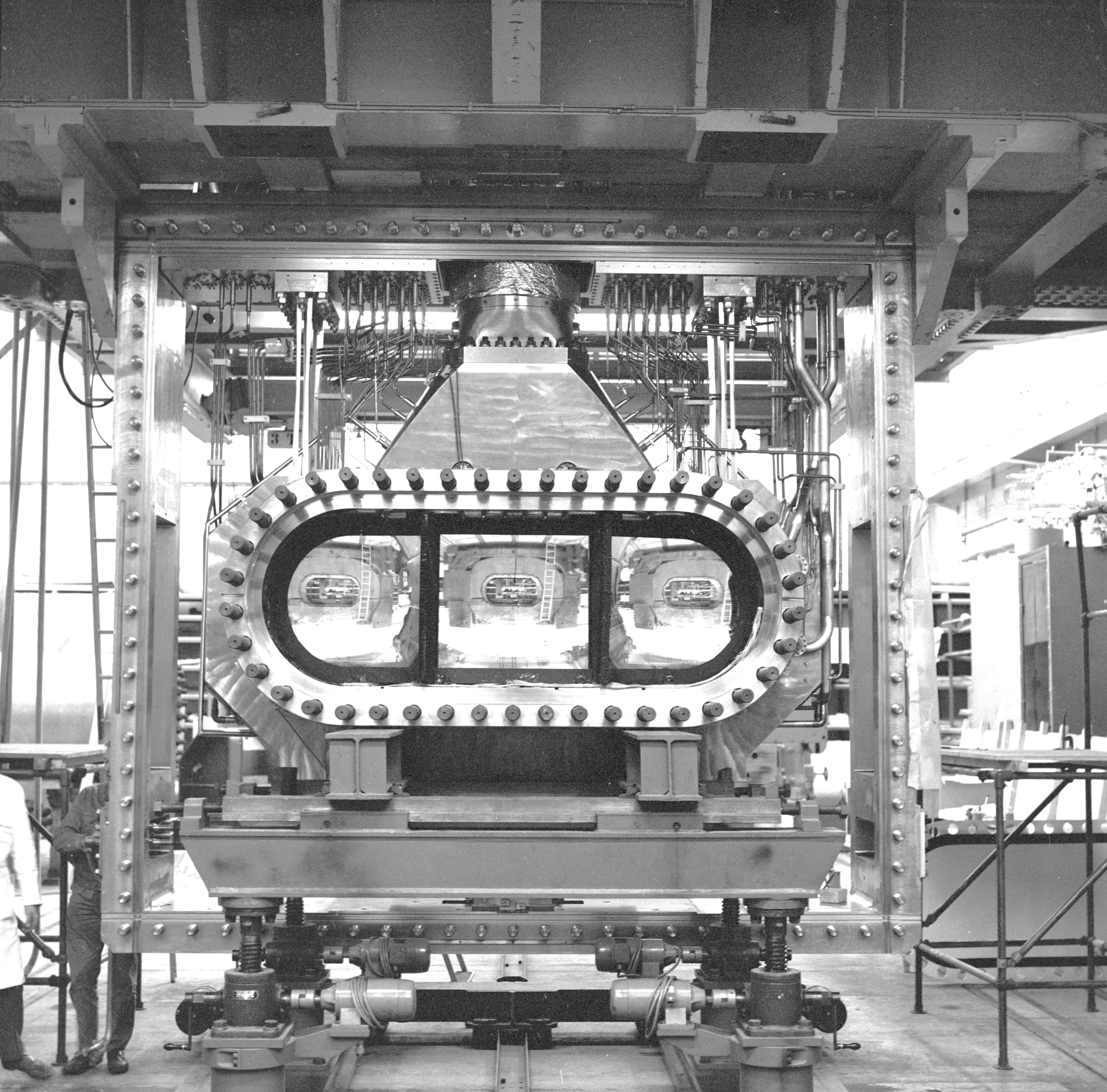
Main body of the 2 m Bubble Chamber at CERN

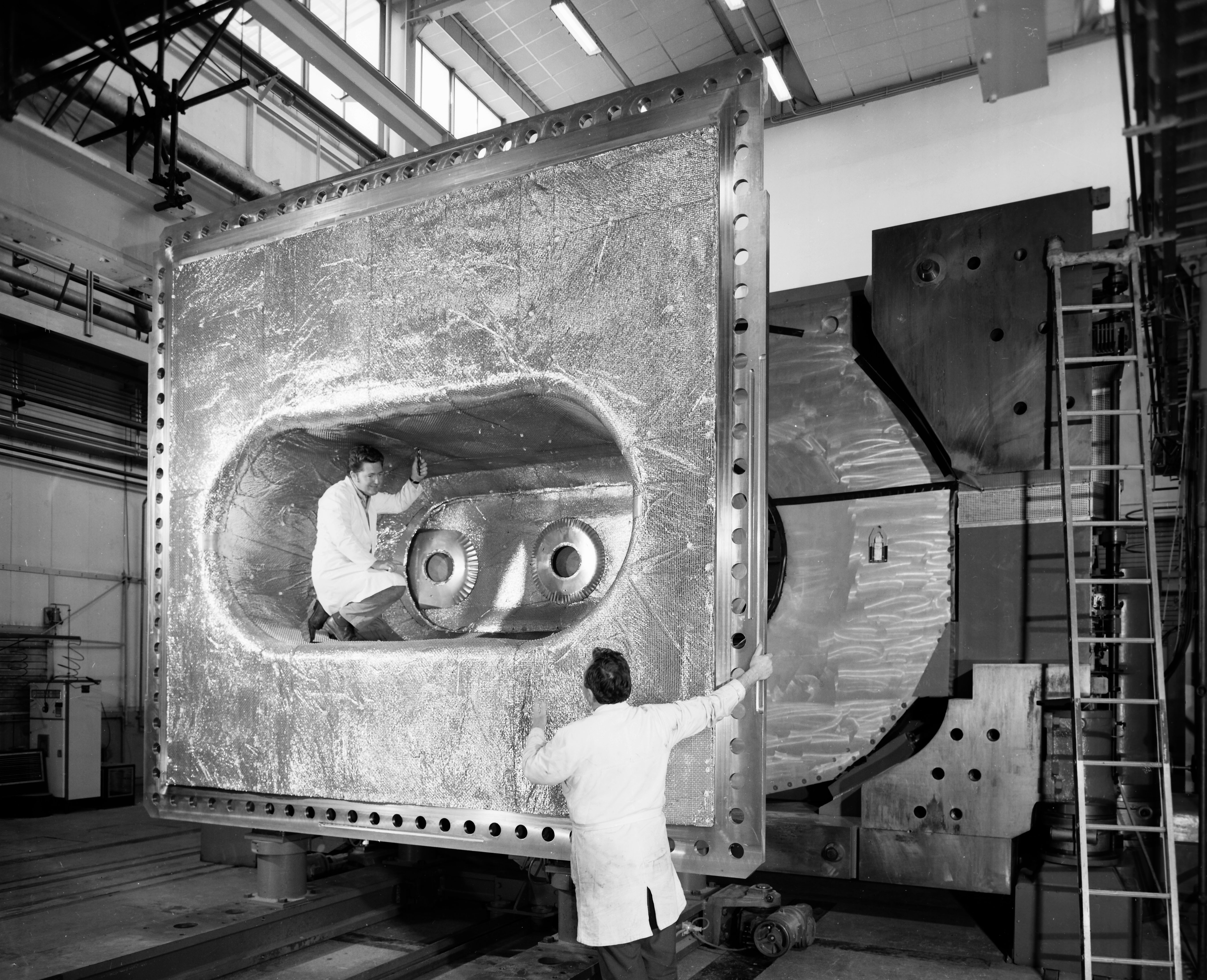
The 2m Bubble Chamber undergoing a series of modifications during the PS shutdown.

The 2m Bubble Chamber was a device used in conjunction with CERN's 25 GeV Proton Synchrotron (PS) machine to study high-energy physics. It was decided to build this chamber in 1958 with a large team of physicists, engineers, technicians and designers led by Charles Peyrou. This project was of considerable magnitude, thus requiring a long-term plan so that all its characteristics could be carefully studied. Several models of this chamber were built and the problems encountered surpassed any of its predecessors. The construction only began three years later and in 1964 the chamber was finally commissioned. This chamber was devoted to the study of interaction mechanisms of high-energy particles and the investigation of the properties of their excited states.

The bubble chamber was filled with 1150 litres of liquid hydrogen and was expanded by a piston placed at the top. The chamber had vertical windows, a magnet made up of copper coils which generated a field of 1.7 T and the whole apparatus weighted more than 700 tons. The expansion system of the 2 m bubble chamber allowed for multiple expansions during one PS pulse, which resulted in three event photos per beam pulse.

A 10 GeV/c K^{−} beam was required to produce the Ω^{−} suggested by Murray Gell-Mann on his SU(3) theory. Hence, in 1965 a RF separated beam was added in order to obtain a separated K^{−} and K^{+} at higher energies than with electrostatic separators. Furthermore, these beams enabled the study of hyperon resonances of strangeness -1 and -2. The most thorough effort in the field was a massive exposure of the chamber to K^{−} at 4.2 GeV/c. Experiments with antiprotons at 1.2 GeV/c, 5 GeV/c and at rest were conducted to investigate the formation of hyperon-antihyperon pairs and 8GeV/c π^{+} experiments to study mechanism of two-body production. The 2 m bubble chamber was also used to study weak interactions and K^{0} decays since it allowed the determination of the K^{0} trajectory independently of its decay over a distance corresponding to various K^{0}_{s} lifetimes.

The experiments were performed with a variety of beams, namely K^{+} (1.2-16 GeV/c), K^{−} (2.8-16 GeV/c), p (12-24 GeV/c), anti-p (1.5-12 GeV/c) and π^{±} (4-16 GeV/c). The ones carried out in the 2 m bubble chamber with hydrogen liquid filling were: T40, T41, T55, T64, T80, T82, T87, T88, T99, T106, T107, T108, T109, T112, T113, T115, T116, T117, T118, T129, T130, T131, T139, T140, T141, T143, T144, T145, T148, T150, T153, T155, T158, T159, T164, T168, T172, T173, T177, T178, T180, T181, T184, T186, T187, T196, T197, T198, T200, T201, T203, T204, T208, T209, T214, T215, T216, T218, T220, T221, T226, T227, T232, T233, T236, T237 and T239; and with deuterium: T52, T68, T97, T104, T105, T128, T152, T157, T162, T169, T174, T179, T182, T183, T188, T194, T195, T202, T210, T211, T217, T246 and T247.

The 2m bubble chamber was very reliable, accurate and extremely productive. In the twelve years of operation, until 1976, it took nearly 40 million pictures of which about 7 million were with deuterium filling and the rest with hydrogen, resulting in a total of 20,000 km of film. The photographs were analysed by more than 50 European laboratories and led to 600 publications. For the first time, these photographs were globally distributed as well as the programs required to analyse them. People from all around the world were able to contribute and be part of the experiments conducted at CERN. After its closure, the 2 m bubble chamber was donated to the Deutsche Museum in Munich.

== See also ==
- Bubble chamber
