= Bubble chamber =

Vessel filled with a superheated transparent liquid

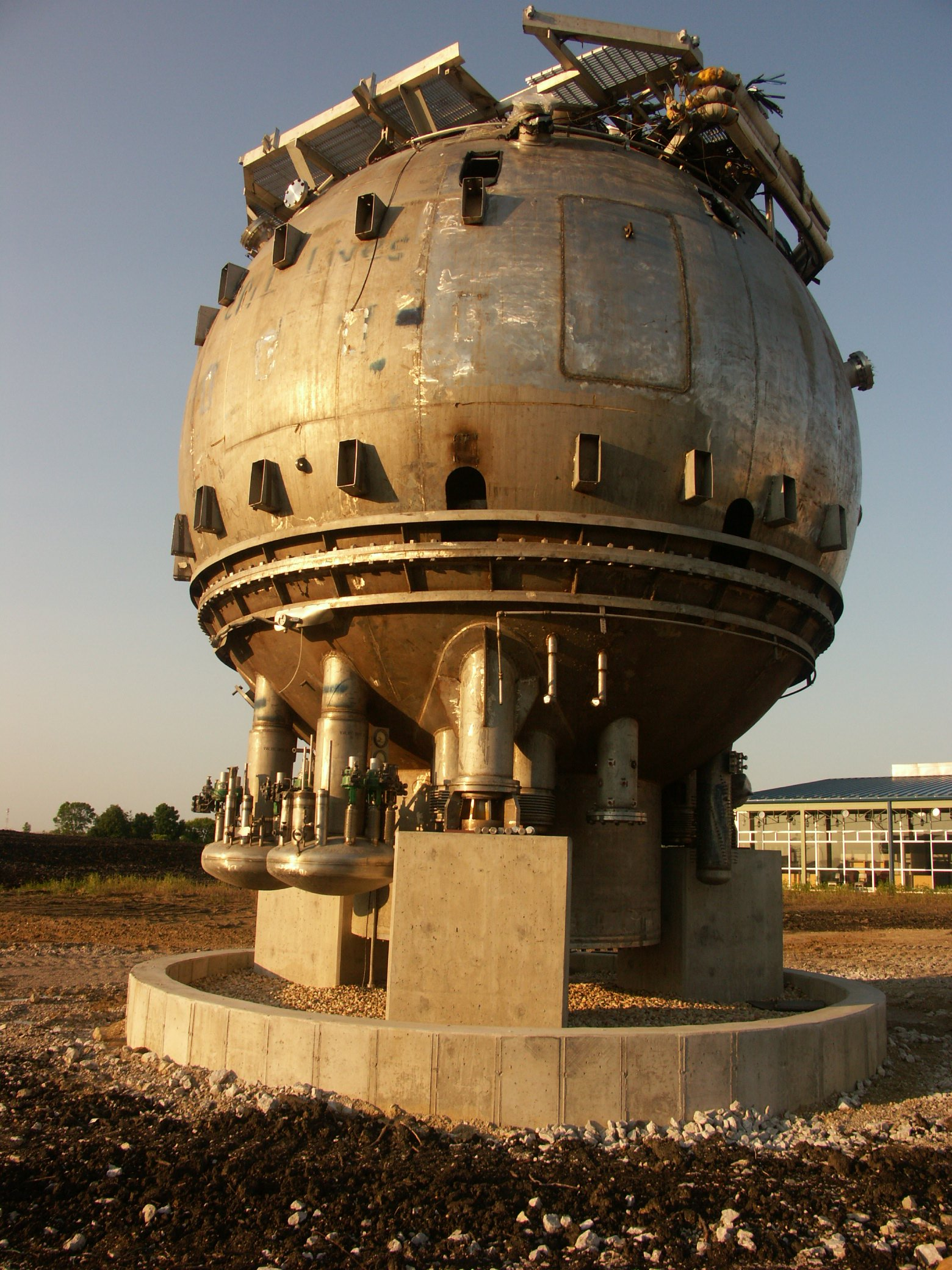
Fermilab's disused 15-foot (4.57 m) bubble chamber

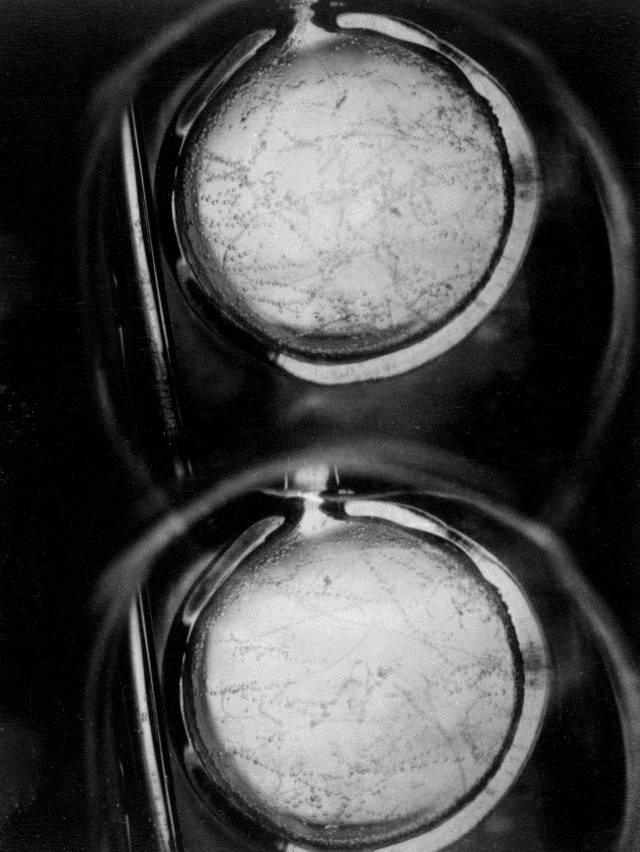
The first tracks observed in John Wood's 1.5-inch (3.8 cm) liquid hydrogen bubble chamber, in 1954.

A bubble chamber is a vessel filled with a superheated transparent liquid (most often liquid hydrogen) used to detect electrically charged particles moving through it. It was invented in 1952 by Donald A. Glaser, for which he was awarded the 1960 Nobel Prize in Physics. Supposedly, Glaser was inspired by the bubbles in a glass of beer; however, in a 2006 talk, he refuted this story, although saying that while beer was not the inspiration for the bubble chamber, he did experiments using beer to fill early prototypes.

While bubble chambers were extensively used in the past, they have now mostly been supplanted by wire chambers, spark chambers, drift chambers, and silicon detectors. Notable bubble chambers include the Big European Bubble Chamber (BEBC) and Gargamelle.

== Function and use ==
The bubble chamber is similar to a cloud chamber, both in application and in basic principle. It is normally made by filling a large cylinder with a liquid heated to just below its boiling point. As particles enter the chamber, a piston suddenly decreases its pressure, and the liquid enters into a superheated, metastable phase. Charged particles create an ionization track, around which the liquid vaporizes, forming microscopic bubbles. Bubble density around a track is proportional to a particle's energy loss.

Bubbles grow in size as the chamber expands, until they are large enough to be seen or photographed. Several cameras are mounted around it, allowing a three-dimensional image of an event to be captured. Bubble chambers with resolutions down to a few micrometers (μm) have been operated.

It is often useful to subject the entire chamber to a constant magnetic field. It acts on charged particles through Lorentz force and causes them to travel in helical paths whose radii are determined by the particles' charge-to-mass ratios and their velocities. Because the magnitude of the charge of all known, charged, long-lived subatomic particles is the same as that of an electron, their radius of curvature must be proportional to their momentum. Thus, by measuring a particle's radius of curvature, its momentum can be determined.

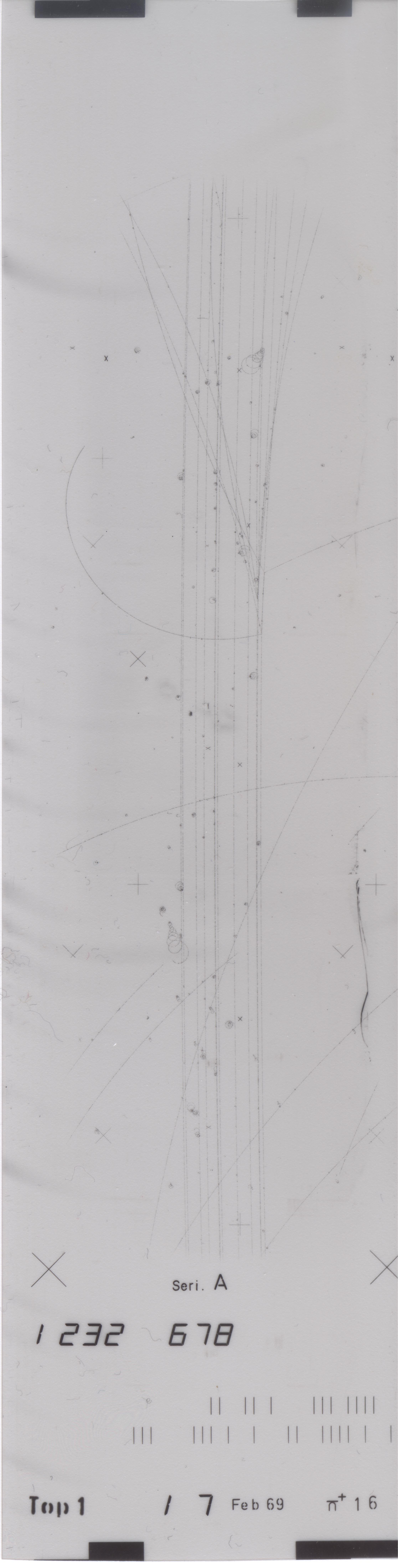
A bubble chamber recording from CERN

A bubble chamber

=== Notable discoveries ===
Notable discoveries made by bubble chamber include the discovery of weak neutral currents at Gargamelle in 1973, which established the soundness of the electroweak theory and led to the discovery of the W and Z bosons in 1983 (at the UA1 and UA2 experiments). Recently, bubble chambers have been used in research on weakly interacting massive particles (WIMP)s, at SIMPLE, COUPP, PICASSO and more recently, PICO.

== Drawbacks ==
Although bubble chambers were very successful in the past, they are of limited use in modern very-high-energy experiments for a variety of reasons:

- The need for a photographic readout rather than three-dimensional electronic data makes it less convenient, especially in experiments which must be reset, repeated and analyzed many times.
- The superheated phase must be ready at the precise moment of collision, which complicates the detection of short-lived particles.
- Bubble chambers are neither large nor massive enough to analyze high-energy collisions, where all products should be contained inside the detector.
- The high-energy particles may have path radii too large to be accurately measured in a relatively small chamber, thereby hindering precise estimation of momentum.

Due to these issues, bubble chambers have largely been replaced by wire chambers, which allow particle energies to be measured at the same time. Another alternative technique is the spark chamber.

== Examples ==
- 30 cm Bubble Chamber (CERN)
- 81 cm Saclay Bubble Chamber
- 2 m Bubble Chamber (CERN)
- Berne Infinitesimal Bubble Chamber
- Bevatron, a particle accelerator with a liquid hydrogen bubble chamber
- Big European Bubble Chamber
- Holographic Lexan Bubble Chamber
- Gargamelle, a heavy liquid bubble chamber which operated in CERN between 1970 and 1979.
- LExan Bubble Chamber
- PICO, liquid freon bubble chamber searching for dark matter
