= List of Super Proton Synchrotron experiments =

List of experiments at CERN, Switzerland

This is a list of past and current experiments at the CERN Super Proton Synchrotron (SPS) facility since its commissioning in 1976. The SPS was used as the main particle collider for many experiments, and has been adapted to various purpose ever since its inception. Four locations were used for experiments, the North Area (NA experiments), West Area (WA experiments), Underground Area (UA experiments), and the Endcap MUon detectors (EMU experiments).

The UA1 and UA2 experiments famously detected the W and Z bosons in the early 1980s. Following this, Carlo Rubbia and Simon van der Meer won the 1984 Nobel Prize in Physics.

The list is first compiled from the INSPIRE-HEP database, then missing information is retrieved from the online version CERN's Grey Book. The most specific information of the two is kept, e.g. if the INSPIRE database lists November 1974, while the Grey Book lists 22 November 1974, the Grey Book entry is shown. When there is a conflict between the INSPIRE database and the Grey Book, the INSPIRE database information is listed, unless otherwise noted.

== EMU experiments ==
EMU = endcap muon

EMU experiments
Experiment	Codename	Spokesperson	Description	Proposed	Approved	Began	Completed	Link	Website
EMU1	—	Ingvar Otterlund	Study of particle production and nuclear fragmentation in collisions of ^{16}O beams with emulsion nuclei at 13–200 A GeV	27 Apr 1984	15 Nov 1984	??	31 Aug 1990	INSPIRE; Grey Book	Website
EMU2	—	P. Buford Price	Search for fractionally charged nuclei in high-energy oxygen–lead collisions	11 May 1984	15 Nov 1984	??	14 Oct 1987	INSPIRE; Grey Book	—
EMU3	—	M. El-Nadi	Interactions of ^{16}O projectile and ^{32}S and their fragments in nuclear emulsions at about 60 and 200 GeV/nucleon	19 Oct 1984	15 Nov 1984	1990	31 Aug 1990	INSPIRE; Grey Book	—
EMU4	—	T. A. Parnell	Measurement of Coulomb cross section for production of direct electron pairs by high energy ions at the CERN SPS	15 Oct 1985	6 Feb 1986	??	3 Sep 1987	INSPIRE; Grey Book	—
EMU5	—	Y. Takahashi	Study of extremely short-range particle correlations in high-energy ion collisions	15 Oct 1985	6 Feb 1986	??	31 Aug 1990	INSPIRE; Grey Book	—
EMU6	—	Alberto Conti	Study of the production mechanisms and decay properties of charmed particles observed in nuclear emulsions coupled to the NA14 spectrometer	11 Mar 1986	5 Jun 1986	??	8 Nov 1986	INSPIRE; Grey Book	—
EMU7	—	John P. Wefel	Interactions of 60–200 GeV/nucleon ^{16}O and ^{32}S (Pb) nuclei in light and heavy absorbers	3 Mar 1987	3 Jun 1987	1987	31 Aug 1990	INSPIRE; Grey Book	—
EMU8	—	Piyare L. Jain	Study of particle production in relativistic heavy-ion collisions	12 Feb 1987	3 Sep 1987	??	14 Oct 1987	INSPIRE; Grey Book	—
EMU9	—	Giorgio Romano	An emulsion hybrid setup for the study of sulphur–nucleus collisions at 200 GeV/nucleon	3 Jan 1989	6 Apr 1989	1990	31 Aug 1990	INSPIRE; Grey Book	—
EMU10	—	Hidehiko Itoh	Study of event structures of 200 GeV/nucleon ^{32}S interactions with nuclei by the Magnetic Emulsion Spectrometer at the CERN SPS	10 Jan 1989	8 Feb 1990	1990	31 Aug 1990	INSPIRE; Grey Book	—
EMU11	—	Piyare L. Jain	Study of particle production and nuclear fragmentation in relativistic heavy ion collisions in nuclear emulsion	6 Feb 1991	28 Nov 1991	1994	11 Dec 1996	INSPIRE; Grey Book	—
EMU12	—	Ingvar Otterlund	Particle production, density fluctuations, and break up of dense nuclear matter in central Pb–Ag and Pb–Pb interactions at 60–100 A GeV	1 Mar 1991	28 Nov 1991	1994	31 Dec 1996	INSPIRE; Grey Book	Website
EMU13	—	Władysław Wolter	Interactions of 160 GeV/nucleon ^{207}Pb nuclei in emulsion chambers with copper and lead targets	1 Mar 1991	28 Nov 1991	1994	1 Jan 1996	INSPIRE; Grey Book	—
EMU14	—	Dilip Kumar Ghosh	Study of multiplicity and angular characteristics in Pb+A interaction at 200 A GeV/c	1 Jun 1992	30 Jun 1992	1994	31 Dec 1995	INSPIRE; Grey Book	—
EMU15	—	Konstantin Aleksandrovich Kotelnikov	Investigation of central Pb–Pb interactions at energies of 160 GeV/nucleon with the help of the Emulsion Magnetic Chamber	27 May 1992	17 Jun 1993	1994	31 Dec 1996	INSPIRE; Grey Book	—
EMU16	—	Y. Takahashi	Isospin correlations in high energy Pb–Pb interactions	15 Jul 1993	25 Nov 1993	1994	31 Dec 1995	INSPIRE; Grey Book	—
EMU17	—	Wolfgang Heinrich	Fragmentation of Pb projectiles at SPS energies	30 Sep 1993	25 Nov 1993	??	31 Dec 1994	INSPIRE; Grey Book	—
EMU18	—	Giorgio Giacomelli	Exposures Of CR39 stacks to lead ions at the CERN SPS	6 Oct 1993	25 Nov 1993	1994	31 Dec 1996	INSPIRE; Grey Book	—
EMU19	—	H. A. Khan	Nuclear fragmentation induced by relativistic projectiles studied in the 4-π configuration of plastic track detectors	16 Jun 1994	22 Sep 1994	1995	31 Dec 1995	INSPIRE; Grey Book	—
EMU20	—	H. A. Khan	Antiproton induced fission studies with plastic track detectors using 4-π geometry	23 Mar 1995	20 Apr 1995	1995	6 Nov 1995	INSPIRE; Grey Book	—

== NA experiments ==
NA = north area

NA experiments
Experiment	Codename	Spokesperson	Description	Proposed	Approved	Began	Completed	Link	Website
NA1		Lorenzo Foa	Measurement of the photoproduction of vector and scalar bosons	12 Mar 1975	21 Oct 1976	17 Jun 1982	18 Jun 1984	Record on INSPIRE Grey Book	—
NA2	EMC	Terry Sloan	Electromagnetic interactions of muons	1 Jul 1974	12 Mar 1975	21 Oct 1976	15 Aug 1985	INSPIRE; Grey Book	—
NA3		Aldo Michelini	Direct photon production in hadron–hadron collisions at the SPS	2 Oct 1974	29 Mar 1984	29 Mar 1984	3 Sep 1984	INSPIRE; Grey Book	—
NA4		Rüdiger Voss	Inclusive deep inelastic muon scattering	7 May 1975	12 May 1977	15 Feb 1979	16 Aug 1985	INSPIRE; Grey Book	—
NA5		Peter Seyboth	A study of hard hadron–hadron collisions with a streamer chamber vertex spectrometer and a calorimeter trigger	7 Jan 1975	4 Jun 1976	22 Sep 1977	23 Jan 1980	INSPIRE; Grey Book	—
NA6		Kay Runge	Neutron elastic scattering at very small angles	14 Sep 1976	20 Jan 1977	??	6 Apr 1980	INSPIRE; Grey Book	—
NA7		S. G. F. Frank	Measurement of the electromagnetic from-factors of π and K mesons at the SPS	1 Apr 1977	22 Sep 1977	??	1 Jun 1982	INSPIRE; Grey Book	—
NA8		Per Grafström	Hadron elastic scattering at small angles	26 Sep 1977	8 Dec 1977	??	5 May 1980	INSPIRE; Grey Book	—
NA9		Terry Sloan	Study of final states in deep inelastic muon scattering	15 Nov 1977	16 Feb 1978	23 Mar 1979	20 Dec 1983	INSPIRE; Grey Book	—
NA10		Louis Kluberg	High-resolution study of the inclusive production of massive muon pairs by intense pion beams	17 Nov 1977	16 Mar 1978	22 Mar 1980	15 Aug 1985	INSPIRE; Grey Book	—
NA11		Robert Klanner	Measurement of charmed particle production in hadronic reactions	3 Feb 1978	25 May 1978	??	Dec 1982	INSPIRE; Grey Book	—
NA12		Yu. D. Prokoshkin	Study of π^{−}–p interactions with neutral final states	17 Aug 1978	16 Nov 1978	??	18 Jun 1984	INSPIRE; Grey Book	—
NA12/2		Yu. D. Prokoshkin, Jean-Pierre Stroot	Search for mesons and glueballs decaying into multiphoton final states produced in central hadron collisions and study of inclusive production of heavy quark mesons	22 Aug 1985	6 Feb 1986	Oct 1986	Nov 1993	INSPIRE; Grey Book	—
NA13		C. M. Fisher	Search for direct evidence for charm in hadronic interactions using a high-resolution bubble chamber	14 Sep 1978	16 Nov 1978	??	9 Jul 1979	INSPIRE; Grey Book	—
NA14		Daniel Treille	Photoproduction at high energy and high intensity	10 Jun 1978	14 Dec 1978	13 Dec 1979	3 Sep 1984	INSPIRE; Grey Book	—
NA14/2		Robert Barate	A program of heavy flavor photoproduction	21 Oct 1982	25 Apr 1983	??	8 Nov 1986	INSPIRE; Grey Book	—
NA15		Som Nath Ganguli, P. K. Malhotra	Search for charmed hadron production in π^{−}–nucleus interactions in nuclear emulsion	19 Apr 1979	14 Jun 1979	??	3 Aug 1979	INSPIRE; Grey Book	—
NA16		David Crennell, Wade Cameron Fisher	Study of the hadronic production and properties of new particles with a lifetime 10^{−13} s < τ < 10^{−10} s using LEBC-EHS	15 Aug 1979	20 Sep 1979	??	16 Jun 1980	INSPIRE; Grey Book	—
NA17		E. Villar	Momentum and angular correlations study in π^{−} nuclei jets at high energies using an emulsion telescope technique with magnetic field	11 Sep 1979	20 Sep 1979	??	13 Sep 1982	INSPIRE; Grey Book	—
NA18		E. Hugentobler	Search for short-lived particles produced on nuclei with a heavy liquid mini bubble chamber	24 Aug 1979	15 Nov 1979	??	22 Feb 1980	INSPIRE; Grey Book	—
NA19		Paul Musset	Direct observation of beauty particles selected by muonic decay in emulsion	3 Nov 1979	15 Nov 1979	??	1 Apr 1980	INSPIRE; Grey Book	—
NA20		Horst Wachsmuth	Measurements of π^{+}, π^{−}, K^{+}, K^{−}, p, and p̅ yields in 400 GeV proton beryllium and copper collisions	11 Oct 1979	15 Nov 1979	??	Dec 1983	INSPIRE; Grey Book	—
NA22	EHS	Ernst Wolfram Kittel	European hybrid spectrometer	10 Jun 1980	16 Oct 1980	??	14 Aug 1983	INSPIRE; Grey Book	Website
NA23		Paul Porth	Study of diffractive dissociation especially into strange and charmed particles with EHS	10 Jun 1980	16 Oct 1980	??	1 Aug 1982	INSPIRE; Grey Book	—
NA24		Klaus P. Pretzl	Deep inelastic scattering process involving large-PT direct photon in the final state	29 Aug 1980	27 Nov 1980	??	15 Aug 1985	INSPIRE; Grey Book	—
NA25		Stefaan Tavernier	Study of charm and bottom particle production using a holographic bubble chamber	11 Nov 1980	23 Apr 1981	??	13 Sep 1982	INSPIRE; Grey Book	—
NA26		Colin Fisher	A prototype experiment to study charmed particle production and decay using a holographic high-resolution hydrogen chamber (HOLEBC) and the European Hybrid Spectrometer	3 Nov 1980	21 May 1981	??	31 Dec 1982	INSPIRE; Grey Book	—
NA27		Lucien Montanet	An experiment to measure accurately the lifetimes of the D^{0}, D^{+}, D^{−}, F^{+}, F^{−}, Λ_{c} particles and to study their hadronic production and decay properties	16 Nov 1981	9 Dec 1981	Apr 1982	1 Jun 1984	INSPIRE; Grey Book	—
NA28		Terry Sloan	Study of shadowing and hadron production in high-energy muon scattering using nuclear targets	15 Jan 1982	17 Feb 1982	??	20 Dec 1983	INSPIRE; Grey Book	—
NA29		Gianpaolo Bellini, Lorenzo Foa	Study of π^{−}–π^{0} production via the Primakoff effect on nuclei	20 Oct 1981	17 Feb 1982	??	31 May 1982	INSPIRE; Grey Book	—
NA30		Guy von Dardel	Precision determination of the lifetime of the neutral π	25 Apr 1982	17 Jun 1982	??	1 Jun 1984	INSPIRE; Grey Book	—
NA31		Heinrich Wahl	Measurement of the ratio η^{0}_{0} squared to η^{±} squared	22 Dec 1981	16 Sep 1982	19 Nov 1987	1 Dec 1989	INSPIRE; Grey Book	—
NA31/2		Heinrich Wahl	A measurement of the phase difference of η^{0}_{0} and η^{±} in CP-violating K^{0} → 2 π decays	10 Mar 1986	5 Jun 1986	??	14 Sep 1987	INSPIRE; Grey Book	—
NA32		Peter Weilhammer	Investigation of charm production in hadronic interactions using high-resolution silicon detectors	13 Jul 1982	18 Nov 1982	??	20 Aug 1986	INSPIRE; Grey Book	—
NA33		Joseph Remillieux	An experimental study of single-vertex (e^{−}–e^{+}) pair creation in a crystal	3 Oct 1983	2 Feb 1984	??	30 Jun 1985	INSPIRE; Grey Book	—
NA34		William J. Willis	Lepton production	22 Aug 1983	29 Mar 1984	Apr 1987	22 Dec 1989	INSPIRE; Grey Book	—
NA34/2		Georges W. London	Study of high-energy densities over extended nuclear volumes via nucleus–nucleus collisions at the SPS	21 May 1984	15 Nov 1984	??	22 May 1988	INSPIRE; Grey Book	—
NA34/3		Georges W. London	Measurement of low-mass muon pairs in sulphur–nucleus collisions with an optimized HELIOS muon spectrometer	14 Oct 1988	10 Nov 1988	Jun 1990	31 Aug 1990	INSPIRE; Grey Book	—
NA35		Peter Seyboth	Study of relativistic nuleus–nucleus collisions at the CERN SPS	26 Jan 1982	3 Feb 1983	15 Nov 1984	10 May 1992	INSPIRE; Grey Book	Website
NA36		Douglas E. Greiner	The production of strange baryons and antibaryons in relativistic ion collisions	29 Feb 1984	15 Nov 1984	??	30 Aug 1990	INSPIRE; Grey Book	—
NA37	NMC	Dietrich von Harrach, Ger van Middelkoop	Detailed measurements of structure functions from nucleons and nuclei	27 Feb 1985	6 Jun 1985	May 1986	22 Dec 1989	INSPIRE; Grey Book	—
NA38		Louis Kluberg	Study of high-energy nucleus–nucleus interactions with the enlarged NA10 dimuon spectrometer	11 Mar 1985	9 Feb 1989	9 Feb 1989	10 May 1992	INSPIRE; Grey Book	Website
NA39		G. Shaw	A search for quarks produced in heavy-ion interactions	20 Feb 1986	3 Apr 1986	??	14 Oct 1987	INSPIRE; Grey Book	—
NA40		John C. Hill	Electromagnetic dissociation of target nuclei by ^{16}O and ^{32}S projectiles	25 Feb 1986	3 Apr 1986	??	14 Oct 1987	INSPIRE; Grey Book	—
NA41		C. Ngo	Search for nuclei in heavy-ion collisions at ultra-relativistic energies	11 Feb 1986	5 Jun 1986	??	14 Oct 1987	INSPIRE; Grey Book	—
NA42		Joseph Remillieux	Study of unexplained hard photon production by electrons channeled in a crystal	7 Jul 1986	30 Oct 1986	??	19 May 1988	INSPIRE; Grey Book	—
NA43		Erik Uggerhoj	Investigations of the energy and angular dependence of ultra-short radiation lengths in Si, Ge, and W single crystals	3 Sep 1987	11 Feb 1988	1989	13 Sep 1991	INSPIRE; Grey Book	—
NA43/2		Erik Uggerhoj	Investigations of the coherent hard photon yields from 50 to 300 GeV/c electrons/positrons in strong crystalline fields of diamond, Si, and Ge crystals	1991	7 Feb 1991	1991	20 Apr 1996	INSPIRE; Grey Book	—
NA44		Hans Boggild	A focusing spectrometer for one and two particles	17 Oct 1988	9 Feb 1989	1990	31 Dec 1996	INSPIRE; Grey Book	Website
NA45		Itzhak Tserruya	Study of low-mass electron pair production in hadron and nuclear collisions at the CERN SPS	Jun 1988	9 Feb 1989	1991	20 Apr 1995	INSPIRE; Grey Book	—
NA45/2		Itzhak Tserruya	Study of low-mass electron pair and photon production in Pb–Pb collisions	22 Jan 1994	20 Apr 1995	Nov 1995	1 Nov 2000	INSPIRE; Grey Book	Website
NA46		Michel A. Chevallier	Darmstadton hunting in the interaction gamma-crystal	19 Oct 1988	6 Apr 1989	1992	31 Jul 1991	INSPIRE; Grey Book	—
NA47	SMC	Vernon W. Hughes	Measurement of the spin-dependent structure functions of the neutron and proton	20 Apr 1988	6 Apr 1989	Aug 1991	30 Sep 1996	INSPIRE; Grey Book	Website
NA48		Augusto Ceccucci (Note: Other people were also the spokesperson of the NA48 experiment over the years. The&action_search=Search&of=hd INSPIRE database entry is listed.)	A precision measurement of ε′/ε in CP-violating K^{0} → 2 π decays	20 Jul 1990	28 Nov 1991	1997	17 Oct 2001	INSPIRE; Grey Book	Website
NA48/1		Augusto Ceccucci	A high-sensitivity investigation of K_{S} and neutral hyperon decays	12 Oct 1999	23 Nov 2000	19 Jun 2002	18 Sep 2002	INSPIRE; Grey Book	Website
NA48/2		Vladimir Kekelidze	Precision measurement of charged kaon decay parameters with an extended NA48 setup	14 Dec 1999	23 Nov 2000	19 May 2003	17 Aug 2004	INSPIRE; Grey Book	Website
NA49		Peter Seyboth	Large-acceptance hadron detector for an investigation of Pb-induced reactions at the CERN SPS	4 Jul 1989	18 Sep 1991	??	23 Sep 2013	INSPIRE; Grey Book	Website
NA50		Louis Kluberg	Study of muon pairs and vector mesons produced in high-energy Pb–Pb interactions	6 Nov 1991	6 Feb 1992	Nov 1994	18 Oct 2001	INSPIRE; Grey Book	Website
NA51		Louis Kluberg	Drell–Yan study of sea isospin symmetry	16 Mar 1992	16 Apr 1992	Jun 1992	17 Jul 1992	INSPIRE; Grey Book	Website
NA52		Klaus P. Pretzl	Strangelet and particle search in Pb–Pb collisions	Mar 1992	30 Jun 1992	Nov 1994	30 Nov 1998	INSPIRE; Grey Book	Website
NA53		John C. Hill	Electromagnetic dissociation of target nuclei by ^{208}Pb projectiles	27 Jan 1993	15 Apr 1993	??	23 Nov 1999	INSPIRE; Grey Book	—
NA54		Bernhard Heisinger, Eric Nolte	Determination of cross-sections of fast muon induced reactions to cosmogenic radionuclides	Jan 1995	20 Apr 1995	??	9 Nov 1997	INSPIRE; Grey Book	—
NA55		Nicholas Mascarenhas	Investigation of fast neutron production by 100–250 GeV muon interaction on thin targets	18 May 1995	8 Feb 1996	Apr 1996	June 1996	INSPIRE; Grey Book	Website
NA56		Stefano Ragazzi	Measurement of pion and kaon fluxes below 60 GeV/c produced by 45 GeV/c protons on a beryllium target	8 Jan 1996	8 Feb 1996	1996	31 May 2006	INSPIRE; Grey Book	Website
NA57		Federico Antinori	Study of strange and multistrange particles in ultra-relativistic nucleus–nucleus collisions	20 Aug 1996	3 Oct 1996	25 Sep 2000	11 Sep 2001	INSPIRE; Grey Book	Website
NA58	COMPASS	Bakur Parsamyan, Fulvio Tessarotto (Note: Since 2021. Over the years also other people were spokespersons of the NA58 / COMPASS experiment.)	Common muon and proton apparatus for structure and spectroscopy	1 Mar 1996	6 Feb 1997	12 Feb 2002	31 Dec 2022	INSPIRE; Grey Book	Website
NA59		Erik Uggerhoj	A crystal as a quarter-wave plate for photons	13 Jul 1998	14 Oct 1998	??	20 Jun 2000	INSPIRE; Grey Book	Website
NA60		Gianluca Usai	Study of prompt dimuon and charm production with proton and heavy ion beams at the CERN SPS	7 Mar 2000	15 Jun 2000	Oct 2001	14 Nov 2004	INSPIRE; Grey Book	Website
NA61	SHINE	Marek Gazdzicki	SPS heavy ion and neutrino experiment	3 Nov 2006	21 Feb 2007	18 Apr 2008	Running	INSPIRE; Grey Book	Website
NA62		Augusto Ceccucci	Proposal to measure the rare decay K^{+} → π^{+}+ν+ν̅ at the CERN SPS. (Formerly designated NA48/3.)	12 Dec 2005	21 Feb 2007	22 Jun 2015	Running	INSPIRE; Grey Book	Website
NA63		Ulrik Uggerhoj	Electromagnetic processes in strong crystalline fields	16 Jun 2006	21 Feb 2007	4 Jul 2007	31 Aug 2023	INSPIRE; Grey Book	—
NA64		Sergei Gninenko	Search for dark sectors in missing energy events	17 Dec 2013	9 Mar 2016	2016	Running	INSPIRE; Grey Book	https://na64.web.cern.ch/
NA65	DsTau	Akitaka Ariga	Study of tau neutrino production	29 Aug 2017	12 Jun 2019	1 Sep 2021	30 Sep 2023	INSPIRE; Grey Book	Website
NA66	AMBER	Oleg Denisov, Jan Friedrich	Apparatus for Meson and Baryon Experimental Research	31 May 2019	2 Dec 2020	19 Sep 2023	Running	INSPIRE; Grey Book	Website
NA67	SHiP	Andrey Golutvin	Search for Hidden Particles	24 May 2016	Apr 2024		Preparation	INSPIRE; Grey Book	Website

== UA experiments ==
UA = underground area

UA experiments
Experiment	Codename	Spokesperson	Description	Proposed	Approved	Began	Completed	Link	Website
UA1	—	Alan Norton	A 4-π solid angle detector for the SPS used as a proton–antiproton collider at c.m. energy of 630 GeV	30 Jan 1978	29 Jun 1978	17 Jul 1981	Feb 1990	INSPIRE; Grey Book; CERN	—
UA2	—	Luigi Di Lella Pierre Darriulat	Study of antiproton–proton interaction at 630 GeV c.m. energy	31 Jan 1978	14 Dec 1978	Nov 1981	21 Dec 1990	INSPIRE; Grey Book	—
UA3	—	Paul Musset	Search for magnetic monopoles at the antiproton–proton colliding ring	2 Feb 1978	14 Dec 1978	1981	Dec 1983	INSPIRE; Grey Book	—
UA4	—	Giorgio Matthiae	Measurement of elastic scattering in the Coulomb interference region at the CERN antiproton–proton collider	6 Oct 1978	18 Jan 1979	1981	18 Jun 1985	INSPIRE; Grey Book	—
UA4/2	—	Maurice Haguenauer	A precise measurement of the real part of the elastic scattering amplitude at the Spp̅S	8 Feb 1990	6 July 1990	1991	1992	INSPIRE; Grey Book	—
UA5	—	John Gordon Rushbrooke	Investigation of proton–antiproton events at 540 GeV c.m. energy with a streamer chamber detection system	29 May 1978	15 Feb 1979	Oct 1981	21 Sep 1982	INSPIRE; Grey Book	—
UA5/2	—	John Gordon Rushbrooke	An exploratory investigation of antiproton–proton interactions at 800–900 c.m. energy at the SPS collider	15 Oct 1982	3 Feb 1983	??	4 Apr 1985	INSPIRE; Grey Book	—
UA6	—	Leslie Loris Camilleri	An internal hydrogen jet target in the SPS to study inclusive electromagnetic final states at large transverse momentum in p̅–p and p–p interactions at √s = 24.3 GeV	19 Aug 1980	23 Apr 1981	1985	21 Dec 1990	INSPIRE; Grey Book	—
UA7	—	Yasushi Muraki	Measurement by silicon shower detectors of the invariant cross section of photons and π^{0}s emitted close to zero degrees	18 Jan 1985	18 Apr 1985	1985	1 May 1986	INSPIRE; Grey Book	—
UA8	—	Peter E. Schlein	Study of jet structure in p̅–p events tagged with large-X proton	26 Oct 1984	18 Apr 1985	Oct 1985	26 Jun 1989	INSPIRE; Grey Book	—
UA9	—	Walter Scandale	Investigates the use of bent silicon crystals as primary collimators to direct the beam halo onto the secondary absorber reducing outscattering, beam losses and radiation load.	16 Apr 2008	3 Sep 2008	May 2009	Running	INSPIRE; Grey Book	Website

== WA experiments ==
WA = west area

WA experiments
Experiment	Codename	Spokesperson	Description	Proposed	Approved	Began	Completed	Link	Website
WA1	CDHS	Jack Steinberger	High-energy neutrino interactions	27 Jul 1973	17 Apr 1974	Dec 1976	22 Dec 1983	INSPIRE; Grey Book	Website
WA1/2		Friedrich Dydak	Measurement of sin^{2}(θ_{W}) in semileptonic neutrino Fe interactions with high precision	1983	15 Sep 1983	??	30 Aug 1984	INSPIRE; Grey Book	—
WA2		Jeam-Marc Gaillard	Leptonic decays of hyperons	13 Nov 1973	12 Jun 1974	??	4 Dec 1978	INSPIRE; Grey Book	—
WA3		Peter Weilhammer	Exclusive π–p and K–p interactions	8 Feb 1974	12 Jun 1974	12 May 1977	11 Sep 1978	INSPIRE; Grey Book	—
WA4		F. Richard	Photoproduction of hadrons	Apr 1974	12 Jun 1974	15 Apr 1976	1 May 1978	INSPIRE; Grey Book	—
WA5		P. Borgeaud	Backward two-body reactions	24 Jan 1974	17 Jul 1974	-	19 Feb 1976	INSPIRE; Grey Book	—
WA6		Giuseppe Fidecaro	Polarization in p–p and π–p elastic scattering	Feb 1974	4 Sep 1974	1977	21 Apr 1980	INSPIRE; Grey Book	—
WA7		V. Gracco	Two-body reactions at large transverse momentum	6 Mar 1974	21 Oct 1976	18 Jan 1979	10 May 1982	INSPIRE; Grey Book	—
WA9		Tord J. C. Ekelof	High precision study of elastic scattering in the Coulomb interference region	4 Oct 1974	22 Jan 1975	??	5 Dec 1977	INSPIRE; Grey Book	—
WA10		M. Martin	Study of K^{±} p → K^{0}_{S} π^{±} p and reactions of similar topology with high statistics	7 Mar 1974	12 Mar 1975	??	6 Nov 1978	INSPIRE; Grey Book	—
WA11		M. David	Search for high mass states produced with the Ψ(3.1). (Formerly designated WA5)	14 Jan 1976	19 Feb 1976	21 Oct 1976	16 Jun 1980	INSPIRE; Grey Book	—
WA12		Jayce D. Dowell	Beam dump experiment in OMEGA	20 Feb 1976	24 Jun 1976	7 Jan 1976	20 Feb 1977	INSPIRE; Grey Book	—
WA13		Peter Sonderegger	p̅+p → Λ̅+Λ at large p-transverse in OMEGA	23 Mar 1976	8 Jul 1976	??	10 Jul 1978	INSPIRE; Grey Book	—
WA14		Antonino Pullia	A wide band beam neutrino experiment with Gargamelle	6 Nov 1975	8 Jul 1976	??	10 Jul 1978	INSPIRE; Grey Book	—
WA15		M. Paty	A wide-band beam antineutron experiment in Gargamelle to study purely leptonic and other rare ν̅ interactions	12 Nov 1975	8 Jul 1976	1978	18 Apr 1979	INSPIRE; Grey Book	—
WA16		Bernard Aubert	An exploratory experiment at very high neutrino energy in a narrow-band beam with Gargamelle	5 Nov 1975	8 Jul 1976	??	11 Sep 1978	INSPIRE; Grey Book	—
WA17		Marcello Conversi	Search for new particles in neutrino interactions in an emulsion stack coupled to BEBC	30 Apr 1976	8 Jul 1976	??	5 Dec 1977	INSPIRE; Grey Book	—
WA18		Klaus Winter	Study of semileptonic and leptonic neutral-current processes and of muon polarization produced in neutrino and antineutrino interactions using counter techniques	27 Oct 1975	8 Jul 1976	??	1 Dec 1983	INSPIRE; Grey Book	—
WA18/2		Klaus Winter	High precision measurement of the ratio of neutral-current and charged-current neutrino cross sections and of total and differential cross sections of neutral current reactions	16 Jan 1984	2 Feb 1984	??	3 Sep 1984	INSPIRE; Grey Book	—
WA19		D. C. Cundy	A study of high energy neutrino interactions using BEBC filled with a Ne–^{2}H mixture	21 Aug 1974	26 Aug 1976	??	15 Jul 1977	INSPIRE; Grey Book	—
WA20		Gerald Myatt	Beam dump test in BEBC filled with neon	27 Oct 1975	26 Aug 1976	??	19 Dec 1977	INSPIRE; Grey Book	—
WA21		Gerald Myatt	High energy neutrino and antineutrino interactions in BEBC filled with ^{2}H	7 Nov 1974	26 Aug 1976	??	Dec 1983	INSPIRE; Grey Book	—
WA22		Ian Butterworth	An experiment in BEBC to compare neutral and charged current neutrino interactions induced by ν_{π} and ν_{K} at the same energy	8 Jun 1976	26 Aug 1976	??	29 Jun 1978	INSPIRE; Grey Book	—
WA23		Philippe Heusse	Study of neutral current interactions using Gargamelle exposed to the dichromatic beam N3	4 Nov 1975	26 Aug 1976	-	19 Apr 1979	INSPIRE; Grey Book	—
WA24		Wilbur Venus	High-energy neutrino and antineutrino interactions using a hydrogen TST in BEBC and a wide band beam	20 Nov 1974	26 Aug 1976	??	10 Jul 1978	INSPIRE; Grey Book	—
WA25		A. Tenner	Neutrino and antineutrino interactions in deuterium	13 Jun 1974	26 Aug 1976	??	1 Dec 1983	INSPIRE; Grey Book	—
WA26		Roland Barloutaud	K^{−}–p interactions in BEBC at 70 GeV/c	7 Jan 1975	26 Aug 1976	??	10 Jul 1978	INSPIRE; Grey Book	—
WA27		Remy T. van de Walle	K^{+}–p interactions in BEBC at 70 GeV/c	23 Feb 1976	26 Aug 1976	??	21 Apr 1980	INSPIRE; Grey Book	—
WA28		Franz Mandl	K^{−}–p interactions in BEBC at 110 GeV/c	19 Dec 1975	28 Aug 1976	1977	26 Mar 1979	INSPIRE; Grey Book	—
WA29		J. R. Fry	Antiproton annihilation at 20 GeV/c using the OMEGA spectrometer	29 Mar 1976	26 Aug 1976	??	11 Sep 1977	INSPIRE; Grey Book	—
WA30		George Kalmus	Direct electron production induced by 70 GeV/c π^{−} interactions using a hydrogen TST in BEBC	16 Feb 1976	21 Oct 1976	??	10 Jul 1978	INSPIRE; Grey Book	—
WA31		Jacques Lemonne	The study of prompt lepton production in antiproton–proton interactions at 70 GeV/c in BEBC equipped with a track sensitive target	20 Feb 1976	21 Oct 1976	??	10 Jul 1978	INSPIRE; Grey Book	—
WA32		Trevor C. Bacon	Direct photon production in p–p collisions using BEBC with Ne–^{2}H filling	1 Jun 1976	21 Oct 1976	??	29 Mar 1977	INSPIRE; Grey Book	—
WA33		A. Muller	Systematic search for long-lived heavy particles in the S1 beam	29 Jun 1976	25 Nov 1976	??	10 May 1979	INSPIRE; Grey Book	—
WA34		Giordano Diambrini-Palazzi	Study of charmed particles photoproduced in emulsion plates tagged by the OMEGA apparatus triggers	11 Nov 1976	20 Jan 1977	??	1 May 1977	INSPIRE; Grey Book	—
WA35		M. A. Faessler	Measurement of the correlations between emitted protons and pions in hadron–nucleus collisions for 50 to 150 GeV/c incoming momenta	10 Mar 1977	10 Mar 1977	15 Feb 1979	17 Dec 1979	INSPIRE; Grey Book	—
WA36		Gerard Bonneaud	Exploratory experiment at very high energy using antineutrinos in Gargamelle	24 Nov 1976	10 Mar 1977	-	19 Apr 1979	INSPIRE; Grey Book	—
WA37		Ian Simpson Hughes	Study of antiproton–proton interaction in the 4.1 GeV c.m. energy region in the OMEGA: Search for narrow charged peaks in K^{+} π^{+} π^{−} π^{−} or K^{+} π^{+} π^{−} π^{−} π^{−} π^{−} systems	24 Feb 1976	26 Aug 1976	??	22 Sep 1977	INSPIRE; Grey Book	—
WA38		V. P. Martemianov	Magnetic monopole search at the SPS	19 Apr 1977	16 Jun 1977	??	1 Dec 1983	INSPIRE; Grey Book	—
WA39		Jayce D. Dowell	Continuation of the study of di-muon production by π^{±}, K^{±}, p, and p̅ at 40 GeV/c	14 Apr 1977	18 Aug 1977	1978	23 Oct 1978	INSPIRE; Grey Book	—
WA40		B. R. French	Search for narrow boson resonances coupled to the nucleon–antinucleon system	17 Aug 1977	22 Sep 1977	??	14 Nov 1977	INSPIRE; Grey Book	—
WA41		Jack Steinberger	Beam dump run to check origin of trimuon and exceptional dimuon events	21 Oct 1977	17 Nov 1977	1977	19 Dec 1977	INSPIRE; Grey Book	—
WA42		Pierre Extermann	An experiment on the strong interactions and radiative decays of hyperons	29 Mar 1977	17 Nov 1977	1979	1 Jun 1982	INSPIRE; Grey Book	—
WA43		Paul Musset	Beam dump in Gargamelle	3 Nov 1977	17 Nov 1977	??	19 Dec 1977	INSPIRE; Grey Book	—
WA44		A. Zichichi	Search for quarks in high-energy neutrino interactions	17 Aug 1977	17 Aug 1977	8 Dec 1977	1 Dec 1983	INSPIRE; Grey Book	—
WA45		Giordano Diambrini-Palazzi	Charmed particle photoproduction in emulsion plates	16 Nov 1977	8 Dec 1977	??	1 May 1978	INSPIRE; Grey Book	—
WA46		Roger Strub	Study of Ω^{−} decays and of the Σ^{−} → N e^{−} ν_{e} decay mode	3 Feb 1978	16 Mar 1978	1978	28 May 1979	INSPIRE; Grey Book	—
WA47		B. Tallini	Continuation of the study of neutrino interactions with dichromatic beams at the SPS, using BEBC filled with neon	16 Feb 1978	29 Jun 1978	1978	11 Feb 1980	INSPIRE; Grey Book	—
WA48		R. M. Turnbull	Study of baryonium states in K^{+}–p interactions using the OMEGA spectrometer	8 May 1978	29 Jun 1978	??	27 Nov 1978	INSPIRE; Grey Book	—
WA49		R. A. Donald	Study of p̅–p interactions involving baryon exchange using the OMEGA spectrometer	20 Apr 1978	29 Jun 1978	??	31 Oct 1979	INSPIRE; Grey Book	—
WA50		Massimo Bianchi	Biological effects of 200 GeV/c protons: An exploratory investigation	6 Mar 1978	18 Oct 1978	1978	16 Nov 1978	INSPIRE; Grey Book	—
WA51		Henry J. Lubatti	Study of π^{±} interactions in BEBC at 25 GeV/c and 60 GeV/c	5 Oct 1978	16 Nov 1978	1978	9 May 1979	INSPIRE; Grey Book	—
WA52		Gerald Myatt	A second generation beam dump experiment in BEBC	17 May 1978	14 Dec 1978	??	28 May 1979	INSPIRE; Grey Book	—
WA53		Giovanni Conforto	A second generation beam dump experiment in Gargamelle	22 May 1978	16 Nov 1978	-	19 Apr 1979	INSPIRE; Grey Book	—
WA54		Jack Steinberger	Beam dump experiment with 400 GeV protons	27 Jun 1978	16 Nov 1978	??	28 May 1979	INSPIRE; Grey Book	—
WA55		Alain de Bellefon	Test of OMEGA Prime accuracy and K^{+}–p elastic Scattering at 12 GeV/c around 90° c.m.	13 Oct 1978	14 Dec 1978	??	28 May 1979	INSPIRE; Grey Book	—
WA56		A. Ferrer	Study of N–N̅ states produced via baryon exchange in π^{+}–p interactions using the OMEGA Prime spectrometer	12 Oct 1978	14 Dec 1978	??	1 Apr 1980	INSPIRE; Grey Book	—
WA57		D. Newton	Studies of high mass vector meson photoproduction in the energy range 20 to 70 GeV	6 Apr 1978	15 Feb 1979	??	17 Dec 1979	INSPIRE; Grey Book	—
WA58		Giordano Diambrini-Palazzi	Measurement of the lifetime of charmed particles in nuclear emulsion exposed to an 80 GeV bremsstrahlung beam in conjunction with the OMEGA Prime spectrometer	Nov 1978	23 Mar 1979	??	28 Jan 1980	INSPIRE; Grey Book	—
WA59		Wilbur Venus	Measurement of nucleon structure functions in horn-focused neutrino and antineutrino beams in BEBC filled with neon	23 Dec 1978	19 Apr 1979	??	19 May 1980	INSPIRE; Grey Book	—
WA60		Luciano Mandelli	Study of strangeonium and baryonium produced in K^{−}–p interactions using the OMEGA Prime spectrometer	14 Feb 1979	19 Apr 1979	??	30 Aug 1979	INSPIRE; Grey Book	—
WA61		O. E. Badawy	Inelastic interactions of high energy hadrons (p̅, K^{+}, K^{−}, π^{−}) with emulsion nuclei	3 Jul 1979	19 Jul 1979	??	3 Aug 1979	INSPIRE; Grey Book	—
WA62		K. P. Streit	Search for charmed strange baryons	10 Sep 1979	13 Dec 1979	??	16 Jun 1980	INSPIRE; Grey Book	—
WA63		A. Muller	Inclusive baryon–antibaryon production in the central region using the OMEGA spectrometer	13 Nov 1979	24 Jan 1980	??	2 Jun 1980	INSPIRE; Grey Book	—
WA64		Erik Uggerhoj	Channelling radiation in a silicon crystal	1 Apr 1980	22 May 1980	??	7 Jun 1981	INSPIRE; Grey Book	—
WA65		Klaus Winter	Further studies of prompt neutrino production in 400 GeV proton–nucleus collisions	25 Apr 1980	22 May 1980	??	13 Sep 1982	INSPIRE; Grey Book	—
WA66		Per Olof Hulth	Further study of prompt neutrino production in proton–nucleus collisions using BEBC	30 Apr 1980	22 May 1980	??	13 Sep 1982	INSPIRE; Grey Book	—
WA67		John Neil Jackson	Study of π^{−}–p interactions at 85 GeV/c leading to K^{+} K^{+} K^{−} K^{−} in the final state – Search for new states	16 Nov 1979	11 Dec 1980	??	4 Nov 1981	INSPIRE; Grey Book	—
WA68		Jack Steinberger	Further study of prompt neutrino production in a proton beam dump experiment	25 Aug 1980	19 Mar 1981	??	13 Sep 1982	INSPIRE; Grey Book	—
WA69		Ewald Paul	Photoproduction in the energy range 70–200 GeV	17 Mar 1980	23 Apr 1981	6 Jun 1985	25 Jul 1986	INSPIRE; Grey Book	—
WA70		M. Martin	Study of direct photon events in hadronic collisions	6 Aug 1980	22 Oct 1981	??	8 Nov 1986	INSPIRE; Grey Book	—
WA71		Giordano Diambrini-Palazzi	An experiment to study beauty production and lifetime in the upgraded OMEGA Prime spectrometer	20 Feb 1981	22 Oct 1981	??	3 Sep 1984	INSPIRE; Grey Book	—
WA72		M. Szeptycka	A study of fast proton production in π^{±}–nucleus interactions using the OMEGA spectrometer	10 Jun 1981	22 Oct 1981	??	22 Mar 1982	INSPIRE; Grey Book	—
WA73		Jean Duboc	A pedagogical experiment using bubble chamber pictures	15 Sep 1981	22 Oct 1981	??	27 Oct 1981	INSPIRE; Grey Book	—
WA74		Jose Mariano P. Gago	Antiproton–proton glory scattering	8 Dec 1981	17 Feb 1982	??	2 May 1982	INSPIRE; Grey Book	—
WA75		Giorgio Romano	An experiment to observe directly beauty particles selected by muonic decay in emulsion and to estimate their lifetimes	16 Sep 1981	22 Apr 1982	??	18 Jun 1984	INSPIRE; Grey Book	—
WA76		Antimo Palano	Study of the mesons produced centrally in the reaction p p → p X^{0} at 300 GeV/c	18 Jan 1982	22 Apr 1982	15 Nov 1984	8 Nov 1986	INSPIRE; Grey Book	—
WA77		Maurice Benayoun	Search for direct production of gluonium states in high PT π^{−}–N collisions at 350 GeV/c	13 Sep 1982	18 Nov 1982	??	31 Jul 1987	INSPIRE; Grey Book	—
WA78		Pio Pistilli	Search for the hadroproduction of B–B̅ pairs	11 Feb 1983	16 Jun 1983	??	16 Aug 1985	INSPIRE; Grey Book	—
WA79		Klaus Winter	Study of neutrino–electron scattering at the SPS	28 Apr 1983	16 Jun 1983	Aug 1986	12 Aug 1991	INSPIRE; Grey Book	—
WA80		Rainer Santo	Study of relativistic nucleus–nucleus collisions at the CERN SPS	1982	15 Nov 1984	15 Nov 1984	12 Aug 1991	INSPIRE; Grey Book	—
WA81		Erik Uggerhoj	Measurements of pair production under channelling conditions by 70–180 GeV photons incident on single crystals	28 Nov 1983	15 Nov 1984	??	30 Jun 1986	INSPIRE; Grey Book	—
WA82		Leonardo Rossi	High statistics study of charm hadroproduction using an impact parameter trigger	16 Oct 1985	6 Feb 1986	Jul 1987	27 Sep 1989	INSPIRE; Grey Book	—
WA83		Martha Spyropoulou-Stassinaki	Investigation of soft photon production in hadronic collisions using the OMEGA Prime spectrometer	14 Oct 1985	6 Feb 1986	??	8 Nov 1986	INSPIRE; Grey Book	—
WA84		Giuseppe Martellotti	Study of the production and decay properties of beauty flavored hadrons	7 Jan 1987	2 Apr 1987	Sep 1989	1994	INSPIRE; Grey Book	—
WA85		David Evans	Study of high energy nucleus–nucleus interactions using the OMEGA Prime spectrometer equipped with a multiparticle high PT detector	12 Mar 1987	2 Apr 1987	Oct 1987	1 Sep 1991	INSPIRE; Grey Book	Website
WA86		Giorgio Giacomelli	Exposure of CR39 stacks to oxygen and/or sulphur beams at the CERN SPS	2 Mar 1987	3 Jun 1987	1989	1 Sep 1991	INSPIRE; Grey Book	—
WA87		Wolfgang Heinrich	Investigation of nuclear fragmentation in relativistic heavy ion collisions using plastic nuclear track detectors	3 Mar 1987	2 Apr 1987	Oct 1987	1 Sep 1991	INSPIRE; Grey Book	—
WA88		James L. Pinfold	Test of bubble damage detectors in a heavy ion beam from the SPS	8 May 1987	3 Jun 1987	Oct 1987	14 Oct 1987	INSPIRE; Grey Book	—
WA89		Josef Pochodzalla	New hyperon beam experiment at the CERN SPS using the OMEGA facility	27 Aug 1987	11 Feb 1988	1990	30 Sep 1994	INSPIRE; Grey Book	Website
WA90		Sheldon Datz	Measurements of pair production and electron capture from the continuum in heavy particle collisions	1 Jun 1989	5 Apr 1990	??	Oct 1991	INSPIRE; Grey Book	—
WA91		Andy Kirk	Search for centrally produced non-quark–antiquark mesons in p–p interactions at 450 GeV/c by using the CERN OMEGA spectrometer	15 Jan 1990	5 Apr 1990	Jun 1991	8 Jun 1994	INSPIRE; Grey Book	—
WA92		Leonardo Rossi	Measurement of beauty particle lifetimes and hadroproduction cross-sections	12 Mar 1990	6 Jul 1990	Jun 1992	13 Sep 1993	INSPIRE; Grey Book	—
WA93		Hans H. Gutbrod	A light universal detector for the study of correlations between photons and charged particles	May 1990	22 Nov 1990	??	10 May 1992	INSPIRE; Grey Book	—
WA94		John B. Kinson	Study of baryon and antibaryon spectra in sulphur–sulphur interactions at 200 GeV/c per nucleon	14 Jan 1991	4 Apr 1991	Oct 1991	Nov 1993	INSPIRE; Grey Book	Website
WA95		Jacob Panman	A new search for ν_{μ}–ν_{τ} oscillations	15 Dec 1990	18 Sep 1991	5 May 1994	10 Nov 1997	INSPIRE; Grey Book	Website
WA96		Luigi Di Lella	Search for the oscillation ν_{μ} → ν_{τ}	11 Mar 1991	18 Sep 1991	Apr 1994	20 Sep 1998	INSPIRE; Grey Book	Website
WA97		Emanuele Quercigh	Study of baryon and antibaryon spectra in Pb–Pb interactions at 160 GeV/c per nucleon	20 May 1991	18 Sep 1991	1994	31 Dec 1996	INSPIRE; Grey Book	Website
WA98		Terry C. Awes	Large acceptance measurement of photons and charged particles in heavy ion reactions	May 1991	16 Apr 1992	1994	31 Dec 1996	INSPIRE; Grey Book	Website
WA99		Sheldon Datz	Measurements of pair production and electron capture from the continuum in heavy particle collisions	3 Dec 1992	15 Apr 1993	??	20 Apr 1995	INSPIRE; Grey Book	—
WA99/2		Sheldon Datz	Charge changing collisions, energy loss, and EM nuclear reactions of 160 GeV A ^{208}Pb	??	20 Apr 1995	1995	25 Oct 1996	INSPIRE; Grey Book	—
WA100		Denis O'Sullivan	Exposure of plastic track detectors to relativistic Pb beam for the purpose of providing calibration for the Dublin ESTEC Ultra Heavy Cosmic Ray Experiment which was exposed for 69 months in Earth orbit	30 Jun 1993	25 Nov 1993	??	31 Dec 1995	INSPIRE; Grey Book	—
WA101		Yudong He	Study of various processes with a 160 GeV/c per nucleon Pb beam	30 Jul 1993	25 Nov 1993	??	31 Dec 1996	INSPIRE; Grey Book	—
WA102		Andrew Kirk	ASearch for centrally produced non-quark–antiquark mesons in p–p interactions at 450 GeV/c using the OMEGA spectrometer and GAMS-4000	15 Aug 1994	22 Sep 1994	Apr 1995	31 Aug 1996	INSPIRE; Grey Book	Website
WA103		Robert Chehab	Experimental study of a positron source using channeling	Oct 1998	9 Dec 1999	16 Mar 2001	20 Jul 2001	INSPIRE; Grey Book	—
WA104		Carlo Rubbia	ICARUS	??	28 Aug 2013	??	28 Sep 2016	INSPIRE; Grey Book	—
WA105		Andre Rubbia	LBNO DEMO	??	28 Aug 2013	??	28 Sep 2016	INSPIRE; Grey Book	—

== See also ==
Experiments

- List of CERN experiments
- List of Large Hadron Collider experiments

Facilities

- CERN: European Organization for Nuclear Research
  - PS: Proton Synchrotron
  - SPS: Super Proton Synchrotron
  - ISOLDE: On-Line Isotope Mass Separator
  - ISR: Intersecting Storage Rings
  - LEP: Large Electron–Positron Collider
  - LHC: Large Hadron Collider
  - AD: Antiproton Decelerator
