= UA6 experiment =

Super Proton–Antiproton Synchrotron (Spp̅S)
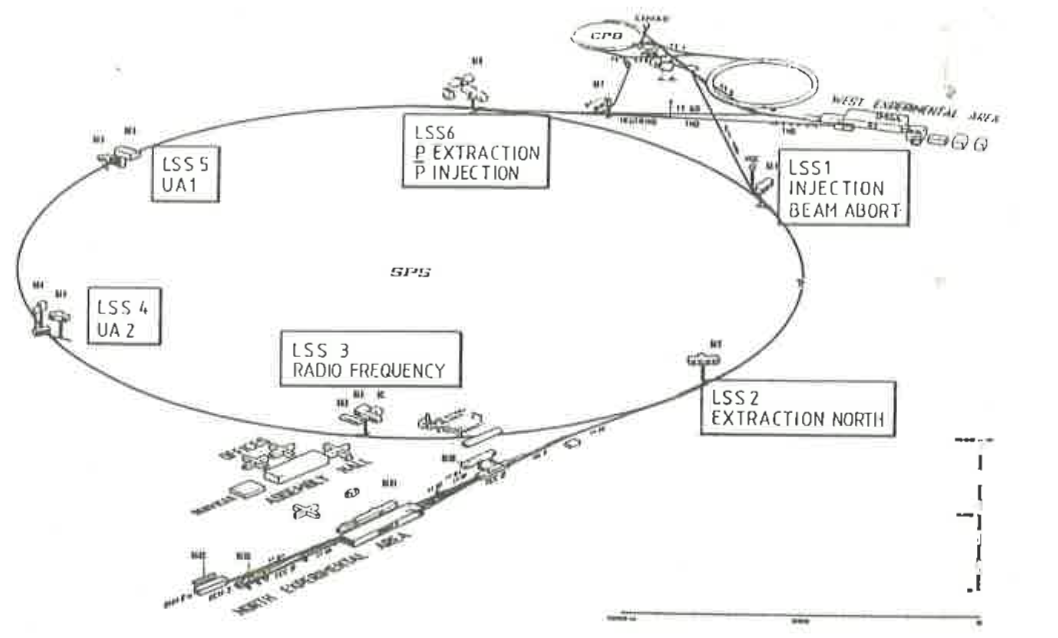

Key Spp̅S Experiments
- UA1: Underground Area 1
- UA2: Underground Area 2
- UA4: Underground Area 4
- UA5: Underground Area 5

Spp̅S pre-accelerators
- PS: Proton Synchrotron
- AA: Antiproton Accumulator

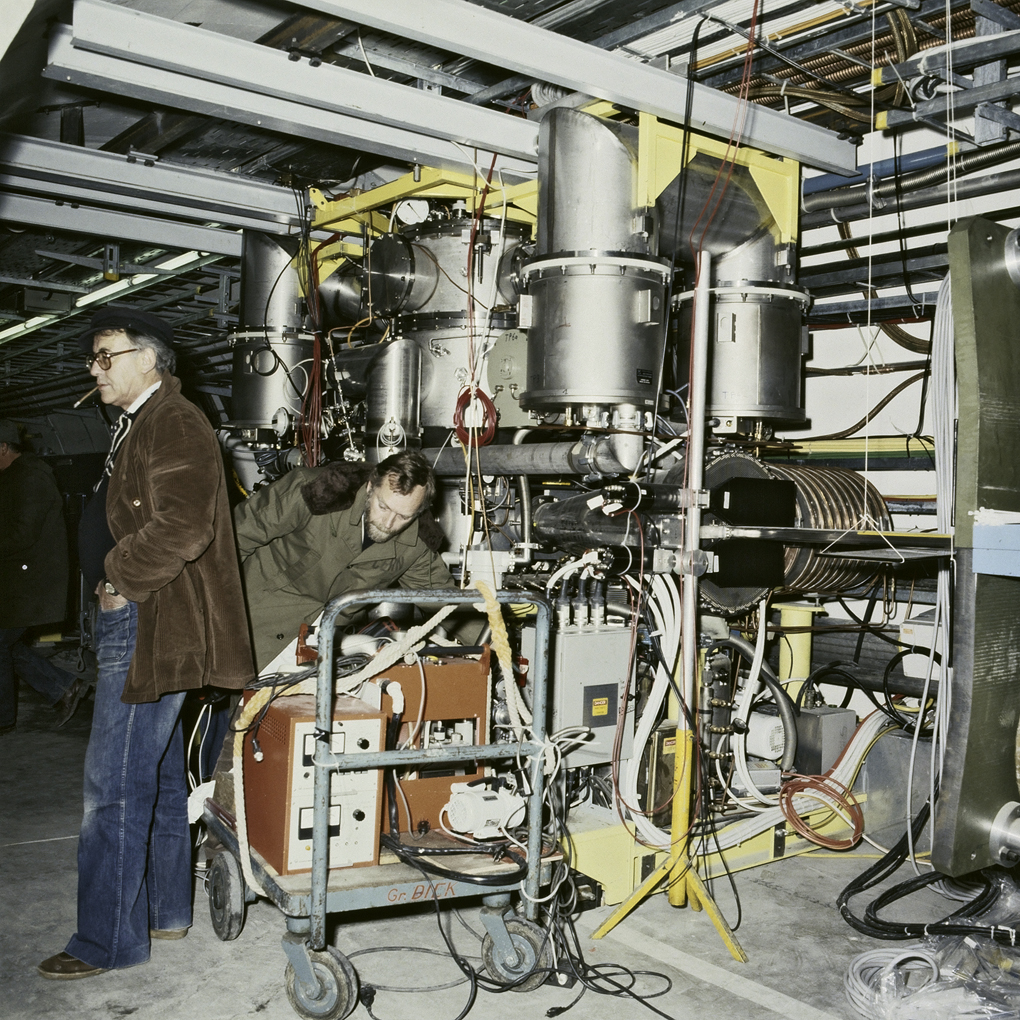
UA6 experiment at CERN

The Underground Area 6 (UA6), also referred to as PHOTONS, experiment was a high-energy physics experiment at the Proton-Antiproton Collider (Spp̅S), a modification of the Super Proton Synchrotron (SPS), at CERN. The experiment ran from 1984 to 1990, with the purpose of studying inclusive electromagnetic final states and lambda production in proton-antiproton and proton-proton interactions. Towards the end of its run it focused more on direct-photon and J/ψ production. The experiment is complementary to the UA1, UA2 and CDF experiments.

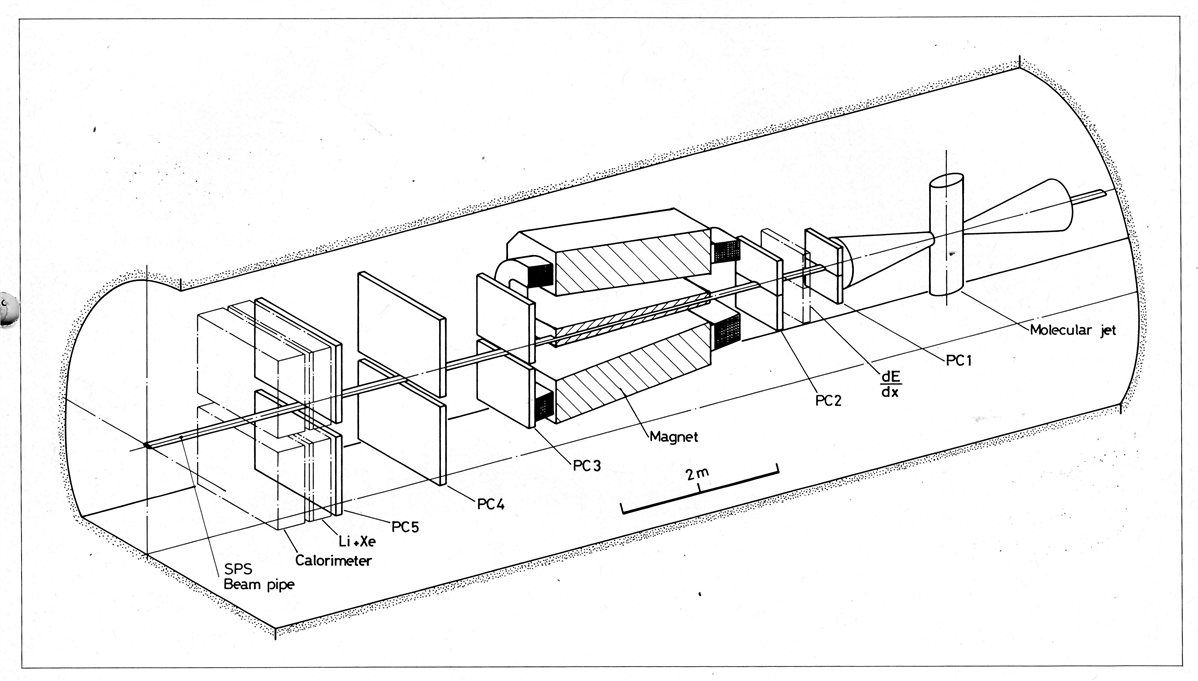
Schematic diagram of the UA6 experiment

UA6 is a fixed target experiment in which an internal H_{2} cluster jet is sent through the collider beams. The luminosity is measured with four silicon detector that count the recoil protons from the scattering. This is followed by a double-arm spectrometer, with each arm consisting of five multiword proportional chambers (PCs) spaced behind and in front of a dipole magnet, an ionisation chamber, a transition radiation detector, and an electromagnetic calorimeter. The spectrometer is placed on the other side of the jet target for pp collisions. The signals for the trigger decisions are provided by the calorimeter and a hodoscope of seven scintillation counters between the first two modules of the calorimeter.

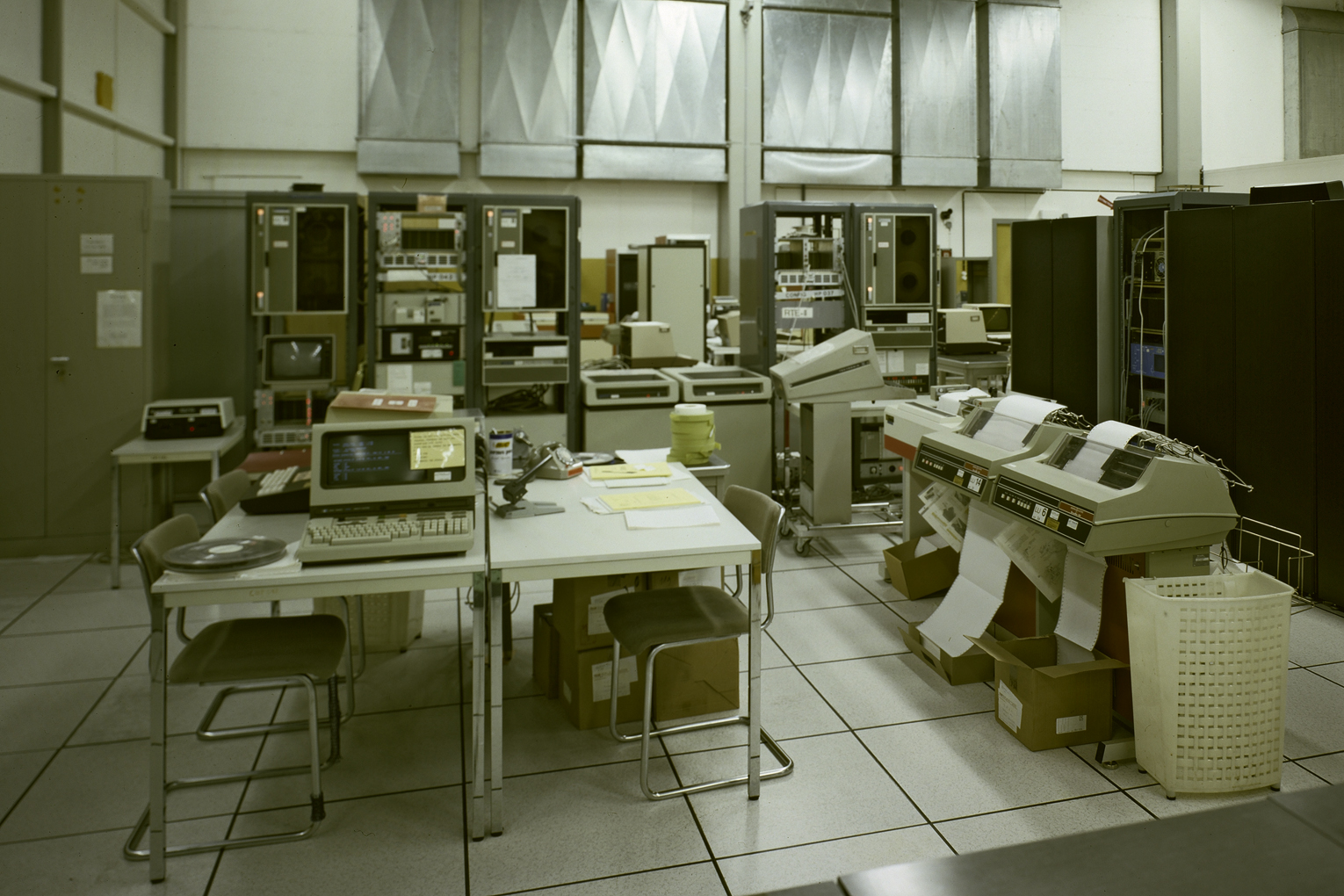
Computer room for the UA6 experiment

Throughout the running of UA6 the detector setup was progressively upgraded, resulting in increased available antiproton luminosity, minimised background interactions, and improved trigger logic.

Preliminary results of the experiment showed clear peaks in the data from the two-photon decays of the π^{0} and η mesons. Results from the experiment was used to publish cross sections for π^{0} and η production, direct photon production, elastic scattering, and J/ψ production.

== See also ==
- UA2 experiment
- List of Super Proton Synchrotron experiments
