= UA7 experiment =

Super Proton–Antiproton Synchrotron (Spp̅S)
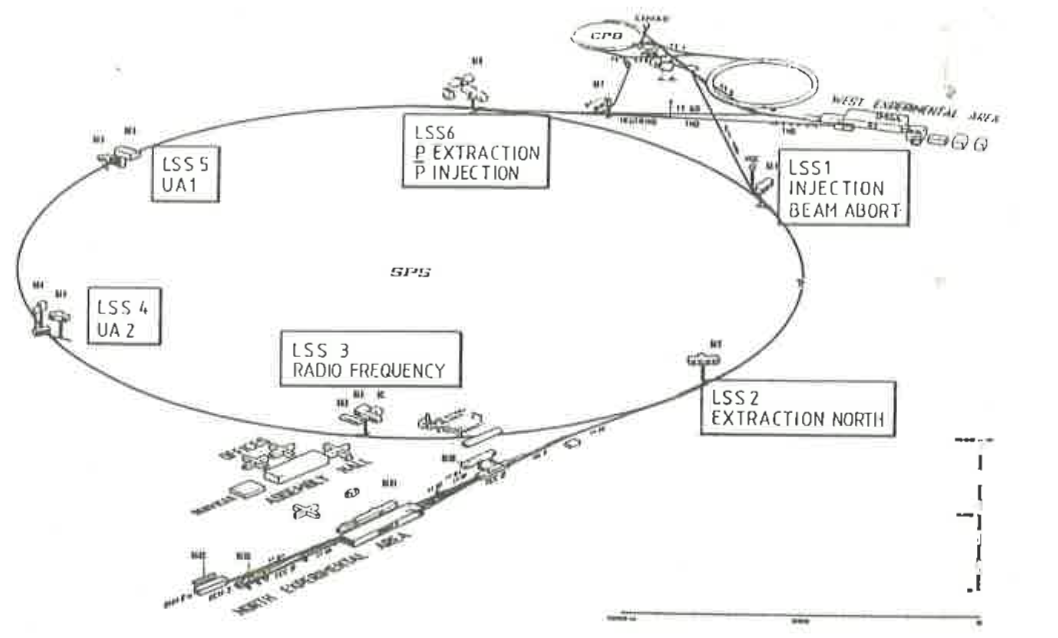

Key Spp̅S Experiments
- UA1: Underground Area 1
- UA2: Underground Area 2
- UA4: Underground Area 4
- UA5: Underground Area 5

Spp̅S pre-accelerators
- PS: Proton Synchrotron
- AA: Antiproton Accumulator

The Underground Area 7 (UA7) experiment was a high-energy physics experiment at the Proton-Antiproton Collider (Spp̅S), a modification of the Super Proton Synchrotron (SPS), at CERN. The purpose of the experiment was to measure the invariant cross section of photons and neutral pions (π^{0}) emitted close to zero degrees, by using silicon shower detectors. The experiment data taking ran from 1985 to 1986, and the final analysis was completed in 1996.

The silicon shower detector setup for UA7 uses the same system of the UA4 experiment. The UA7 adds three cylindrical compact calorimeters installed on the antiproton outgoing side, a 4" calorimeter at a Roman pot on a section of the SPS beamline, and 4" and 3" diameter calorimeters just outside the beam pipe. The 3" and 4" calorimeters were composed of tungsten plates interspaced by 9 and 16 layers of silicon wafers respectively, with the same diameter. Each silicon plate has an electrode on its front and back surfaces. The direction of the strips on the front and back surface are perpendicular to each other, with the strips on one of the layers oriented at 45° to the others. The coordinates of detected events are determined from signals from electrodes which are sent to an amplifier.

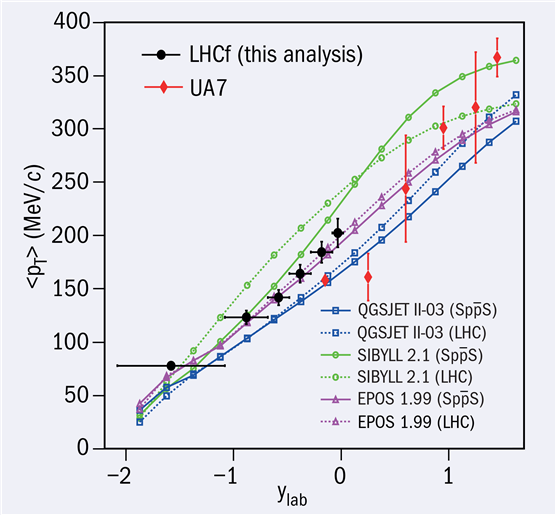
Average pT as a function of ylab, showing data from UA7

The trigger pulse is created by the scintillators at the Roman pot and fast scintillators at a specific angular range. The condition was created by the UA4 trigger system, is similar to that used by the UA1 and UA5 experiments. The trigger pulse has four categories: single arm trigger, double arm trigger, single arm calorimeter trigger, and a double arm calorimeter trigger. These categories identify and select events of interest based on the signals detectors in different parts of the detector.

Results from the UA7 experiment have produced the differential cross section for photons at different centre of mass energies. The data from the experiment rejects the previous claim that Feynman scaling at the fragmentation region (central region) is violated at certain transverse momenta. This would imply that composition of heavy cosmic ray components must be abundant at high energy ranges (10^{15} - 10^{16} eV). However, analysis following the completion of the experiment suggests that there was scale-breaking evidence in the forward region within the data collected.

== See also ==
- List of Super Proton Synchrotron experiments
- UA1 experiment
- UA4 experiment
- UA5 experiment
