= UA3 experiment =

Particle physics experiment at CERN

Super Proton–Antiproton Synchrotron (Spp̅S)
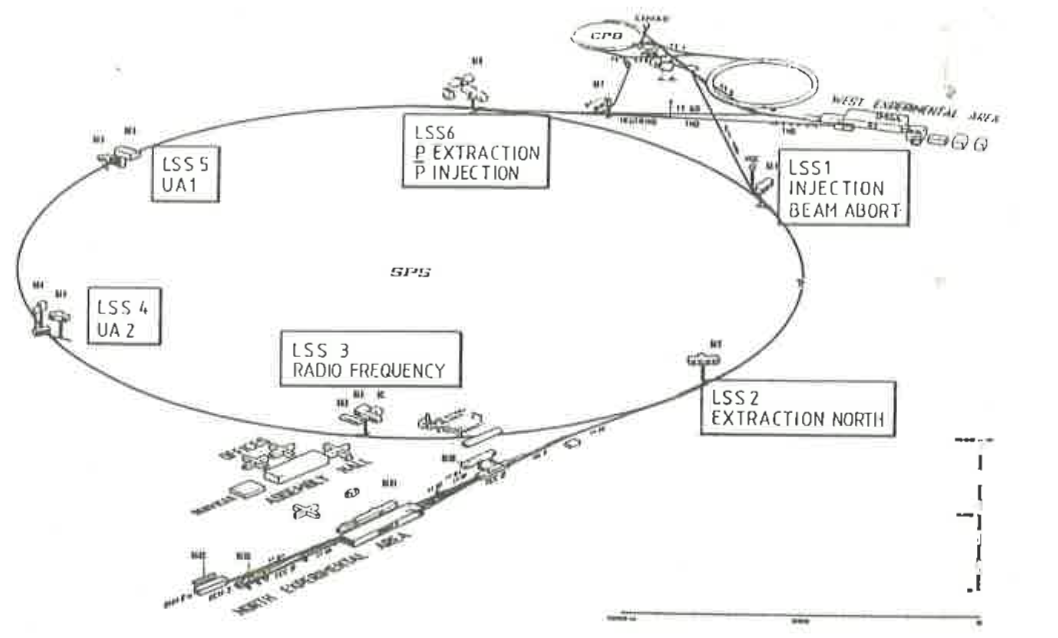

Key Spp̅S Experiments
- UA1: Underground Area 1
- UA2: Underground Area 2
- UA4: Underground Area 4
- UA5: Underground Area 5

Spp̅S pre-accelerators
- PS: Proton Synchrotron
- AA: Antiproton Accumulator

The Underground Area 3 (UA3) experiment was a high-energy physics experiment at the Proton-Antiproton Collider (Spp̅S), a modification of the Super Proton Synchrotron (SPS), at CERN. The experiment ran from 1978 to 1988 with the objective of searching for magnetic monopoles. No evidence for magnetic monopoles was found by the UA3 experiment.

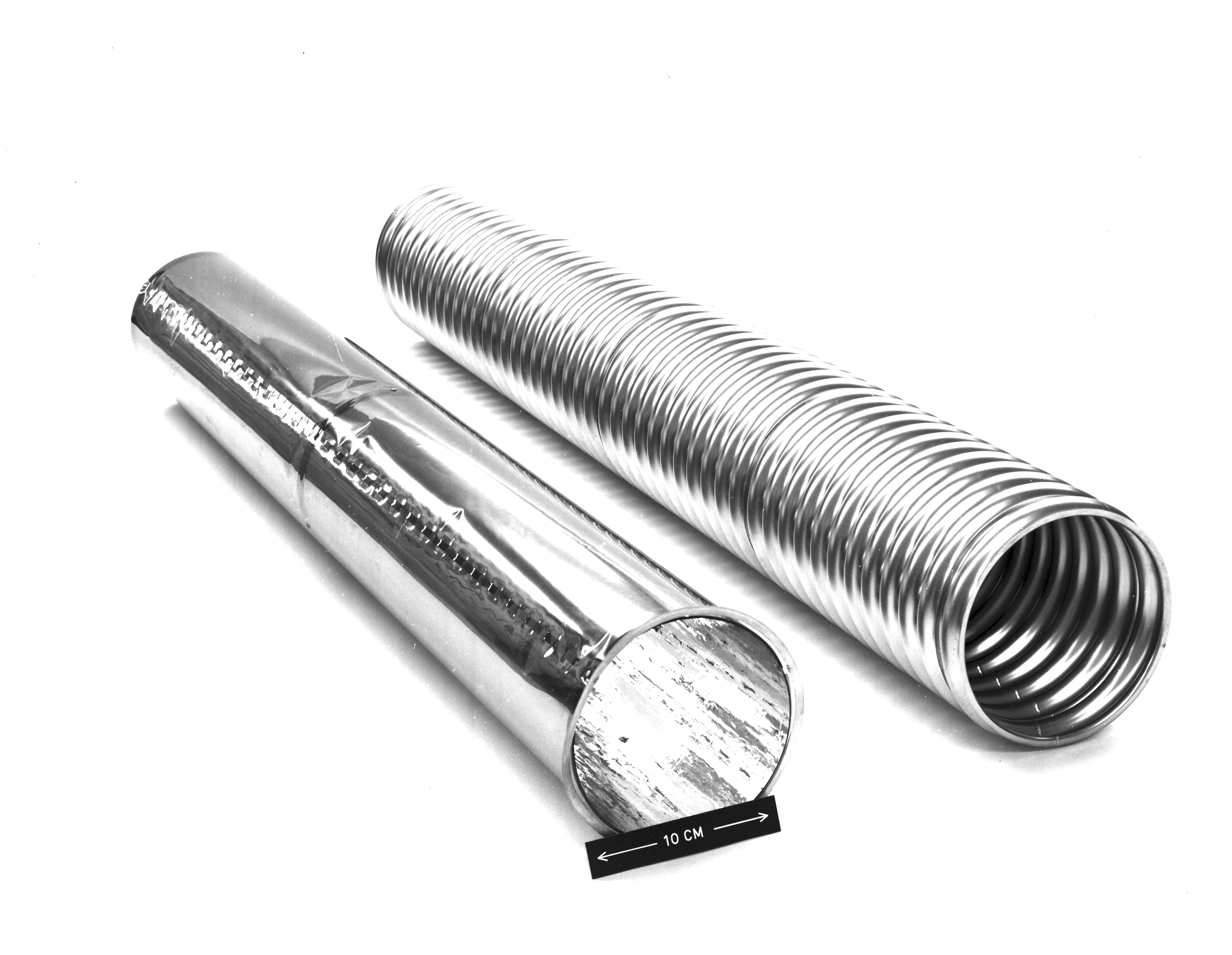
UA3 detector in vacuum chamber

The experiment shares the same intersection region used as the UA1 colliding experiment, and looked for expected high ionisation of magnetic monopole in plastic detectors. The beam pipe was a stainless steel corrugated cylinder, with 0.2 mm thickness.

Plastic detectors were used as they are best suited to the chemically etched tracks left by the ionising particles, and they resist high temperatures during baking. The plastic detectors used were 125μm thick kapton foils. The foils were placed inside of the vacuum chamber and around the central track detector for the UA1. Three cylindrical and four transverse layers of detectors were placed between three chambers: two forward chambers and a central chamber. This covered the maximum solid angle possible.

Holes etched along a monopole track were determined using diffusion of a gas or dye through the holes, followed by a chemical reaction. The ionisation rates of magnetic monopoles were predicted to be very high due to their short range.

== See also ==
- List of Super Proton Synchrotron experiments
- UA1 experiment
