= WA89 experiment =

Physics experiment

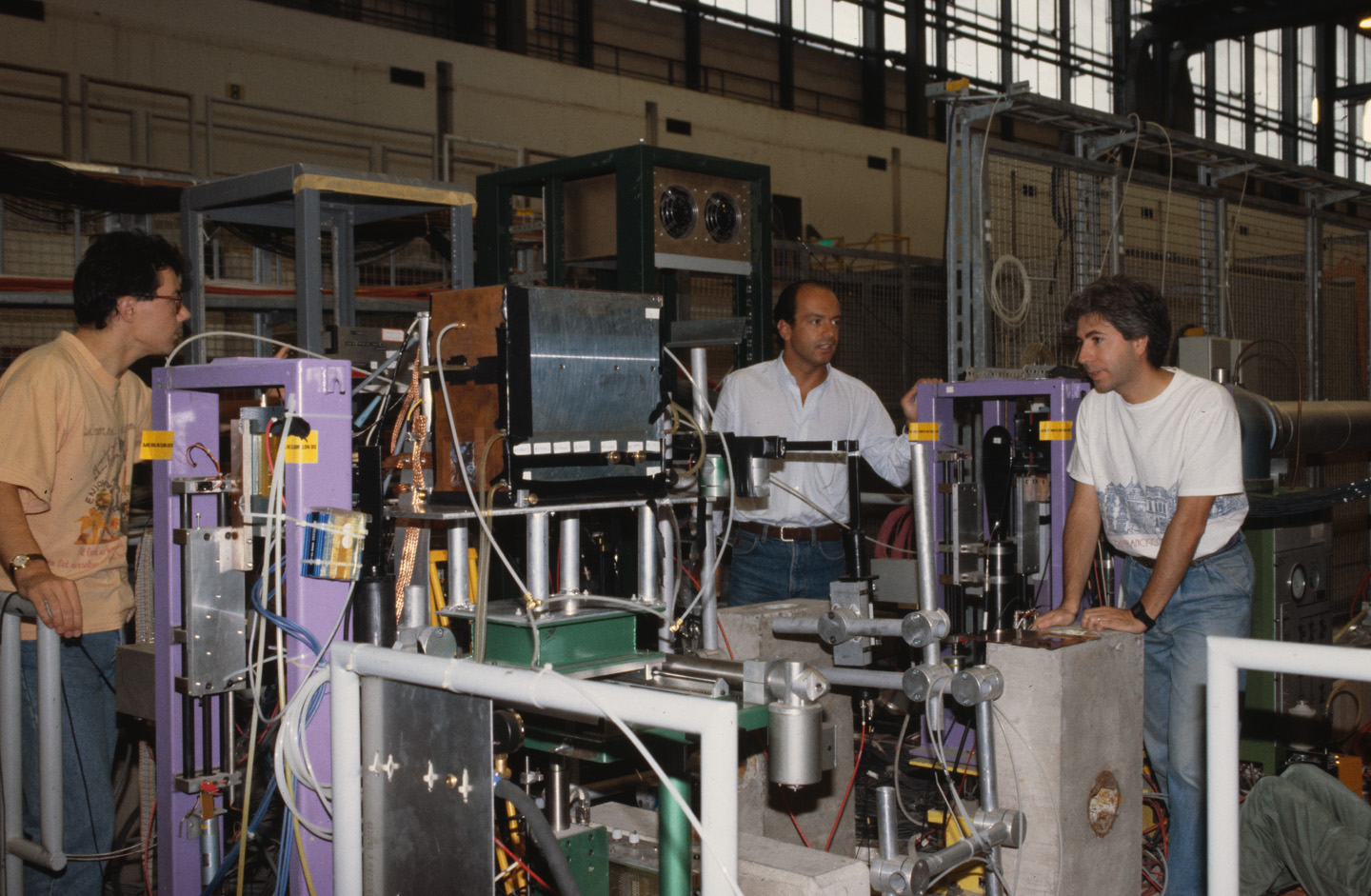
WA89 experiment equipment at CERN

The WA89 experiment (Omega/Hyperon) was a particle physics experiment operating from 1989 to 1994 in the West Area of the SPS accelerator at CERN. It was a large acceptance forward spectrometer dedicated to the spectroscopy of charmed strange baryons and exotic multiquark states produced by a hyperon beam.

The initial aims of the hyperon beam experiment were to investigate charmed-strange quark baryons, verify and investigate the U(3100) and study baryonic resonances and decays whilst searching for the double-strange dibaryon H.

== Experimental setup ==
The WA89 experiment consisted of a beamline and a forward spectrometer. The beamline contained the proton beam hitting the hyperon production target which was followed by a 13 m-long (43 ft) hyperon channel. Three dipoles were used to provide a bending power of 8.4 Tesla-meters. The target region consisted of two adjacent targets surrounded by muon strip detectors. Following this, a 15 m-long (49 ft) Λ decay region was filled with six drift chamber sets and a spectrometer magnet.

The beam particle trajectories along with their momenta were measured with a scintillating fibre hodoscope in the beamline and a silicon microstrip detector at the end of the line.
