= LExan Bubble Chamber =

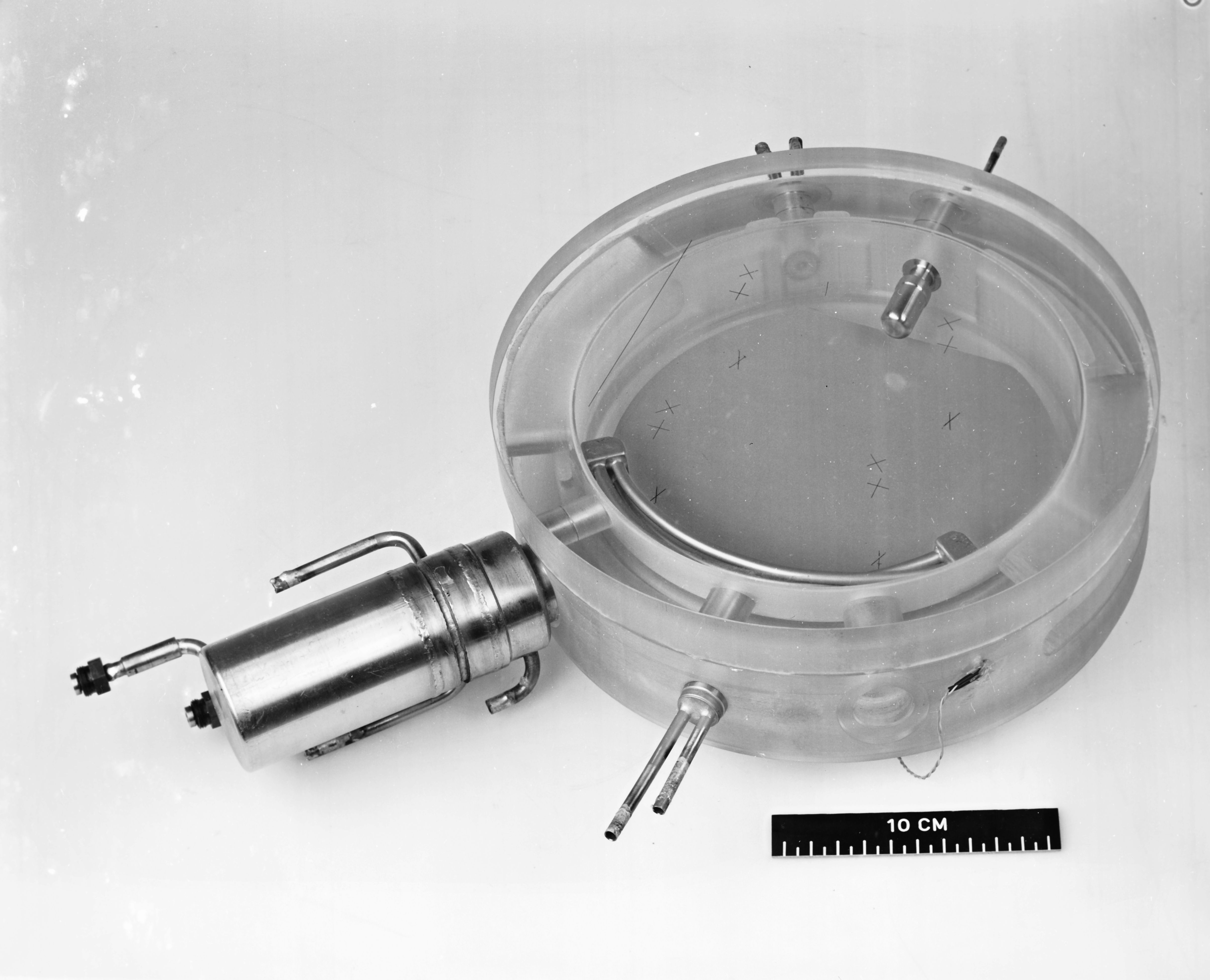
LEBC2, the Lexan bubble chamber, which had a diameter of 20 cm and was made of transparent plastic.

The construction of the LExan Bubble Chamber, LEBC, was approved by the CERN Research Board on 16 November 1978.

Bubble chambers are similar to cloud chambers, both in application and in basic principle. A chamber is normally made by filling a large cylinder with a liquid heated to just below its boiling point. As particles enter the chamber, a piston suddenly decreases its pressure, and the liquid enters into a superheated, metastable phase. Charged particles create an ionization track, around which the liquid vaporizes, forming microscopic bubbles. Bubble density around a track is proportional to a particle's energy loss. Bubbles grow in size as the chamber expands, until they are large enough to be seen or photographed. Several cameras are mounted around it, allowing a three-dimensional image of an event to be captured.

LEBC was 20 centimetres in diameter and contained one litre of liquid hydrogen. It was designed to look for charmed particles, a type of particles that are so unstable that they usually decay too quickly to be detected in big bubble chambers. The bubbles in a small chamber like LEBC were about ten times smaller compared to the bubbles in the large chambers. Hence, LEBC had a higher probability of detecting short tracks. LEBC was used for several CERN experiments in Geneva, among others NA13, NA16 and NA27, before it was transported to Fermilab outside Chicago where it was used for experiment E743. The NA13 experiment was performed by exposing LEBC without any down-stream particle spectrometer. While for the NA16 experiment, LEBC was placed at the vertex position of the European Hybrid Spectrometer (EHS) that provided momentum analysis, particle identification and gamma detection for secondaries emerging from the hydrogen interactions.

== See also ==
- Bubble chamber
