= Dilepton =

Subatomic particles

A dilepton or lepton pair is a lepton-antilepton pair. They can be emitted during heavy-ion collisions. In the parton model, these pairs result from the Drell–Yan process.

== Experimental advantages ==
Photons are also created in heavy-ion collisions, but a key advantage of thermal dileptons over real photons is the presence of an additional kinematic variable: the invariant mass. While real photons are characterized only by their transverse momentum (p_{T}), lepton pairs are described by both invariant mass (M) and transverse momentum. For thermal radiation, transverse-momentum spectra are sensitive to a combination of temperature and collective expansion velocity (radial flow), which complicates their interpretation. By contrast, the invariant mass is Lorentz invariant and largely insensitive to flow effects, making the dilepton mass spectrum a particularly clean and largely model-independent observable for extracting the true thermal temperature of the emitting medium.

In the intermediate-mass region (IMR), with invariant mass above about 1 GeV, hadronic resonance contributions become small and the electromagnetic spectral function is expected to be approximately flat, as in the black-body case. In this regime, thermal dilepton emission exhibits a nearly exponential, Planck-like mass spectrum, providing direct access to the average temperature of the emitting medium and sensitivity to radiation from the deconfined QGP phase.

== Experimental evidence ==
=== CERES experiment ===
The first experimental evidence for thermal dilepton production in relativistic heavy-ion collisions was obtained by the CERES experiment at the CERN Super Proton Synchrotron (SPS), which observed an enhancement of low-mass lepton pairs above known hadronic decay sources. These measurements established dileptons as sensitive probes of hot and dense strongly interacting matter and of in-medium modifications of vector mesons.

=== NA60 experiment ===
A major advance was achieved by the NA60 experiment at the SPS, which measured thermal dilepton radiation with unprecedented mass resolution and statistical precision for heavy-ion collisions.

==== Low-mass region (LMR) ====
In the low-mass region (M < 1 GeV), NA60 demonstrated that the dilepton excess is dominated by hadronic radiation, primarily π^{+}π^{−} annihilation mediated by a strongly broadened in-medium ρ meson. The measurements provided direct experimental access to the in-medium ρ spectral function and resolved a long-standing controversy regarding its modifications in hot and dense matter. The observed strong broadening, without a significant mass shift, revealed the mechanism related to chiral symmetry restoration near the QCD phase boundary, offering experimental insight into how hadron properties are modified as chiral symmetry is restored in the medium. In addition, the data exhibited clear signatures of collective radial flow, linking the dilepton signal to the dynamics of the expanding fireball and to the evolution of the strongly interacting medium.

==== Intermediate-mass region (IMR) ====
In the intermediate-mass region (M ≳ 1.1 GeV), NA60 observed a nearly exponential mass spectrum consistent with thermal radiation from a source with a flat electromagnetic spectral function. Fits to the IMR mass spectrum yielded temperatures exceeding 200 MeV (e.g. T = 205 ± 12 MeV for 1.1 < M < 2.0 GeV and T = 230 ± 10 MeV for 1.1 < M < 2.4 GeV), well above the QCD critical temperature T_{c} of 155 MeV as determined by lattice QCD. Because invariant mass is Lorentz invariant, these results provide a direct, flow-independent measurement of the medium temperature.

Independent analyses of transverse-mass spectra revealed a characteristic change around M = 1 GeV: the effective slope parameter increases with mass in the LMR, consistent with hadronic emission boosted by radial flow, but drops and becomes approximately constant in the IMR, with T_{eff} values around 200 MeV. This behaviour indicated early emission with comparatively little collective flow (i.e. little or no blue shift). NA60 also measured the angular distributions of the excess dileptons and found them to be consistent with isotropy, with vanishing polarization coefficients, supporting an interpretation of the excess as thermal radiation from a randomized medium rather than from strongly directed annihilation processes.

== Significance ==
Taken together, the measured dilepton mass spectra, transverse-momentum distributions, and angular distributions provide a largely model-independent signature of thermal radiation from the hot and dense medium created in heavy-ion collisions and establish thermal dileptons as an experimental thermometer for quark–gluon matter.

== See also ==
- Pair production
