= Search for Hidden Particles =

Particle physics experiment at CERN

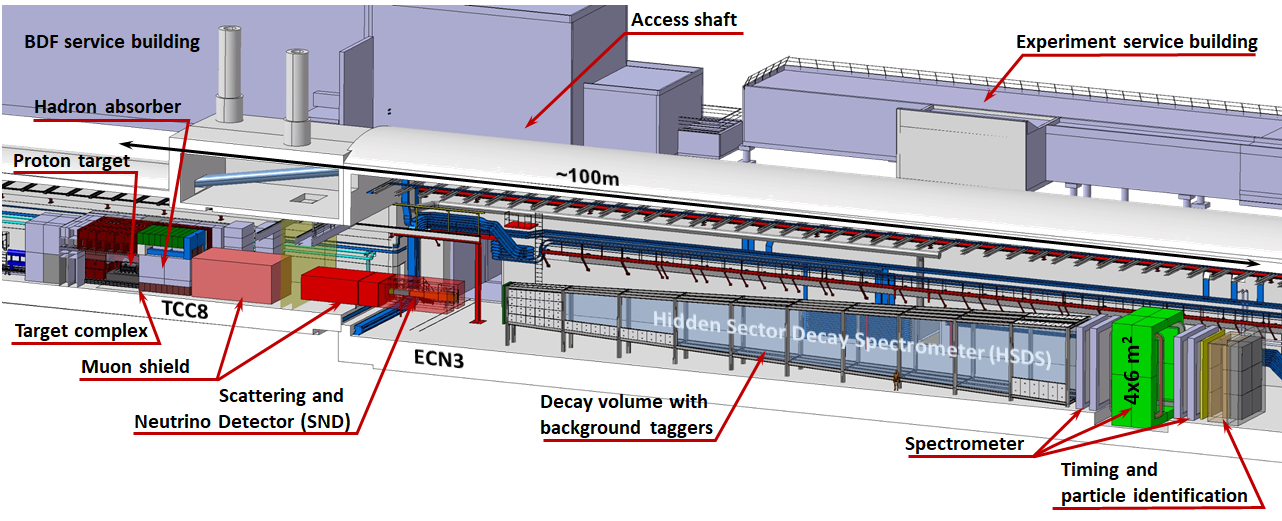

The Search for Hidden Particles (SHiP) is an approved fixed-target experiment at CERN's Super Proton Synchrotron (SPS) which will explore and seek to exceed the limits of known physics at the highest intensities. The experiment traces its origin to an Expression of Interest released in October 2013 to the SPS Council. (SPSC) Following this, a Technical Proposal was submitted in April 2015, describing the experimental and detector facility. A Comprehensive Design Study was completed during 2016–19. In 2020, the update to the European Strategy for Particle Physics (ESPP) denied funding for the construction of the Beam Dump Facility (BDF) which was supposed to host SHiP. This forced the SHiP collaboration to seek another facility for the construction of the BDF and SHiP experiment, eventually determining that ECN3 in CERN's North Area was the only suitable location. BDF and SHiP were subsequently approved in 2024. The experiment will begin in 2033.

The SHiP Collaboration intends to search for weakly interacting particles whose interactions are too weak to be observed anywhere else, particularly in the well-motivated MeV–GeV mass range. Such particles cannot be detected at colliders such as the Large Hadron Collider. Alongside, the SHiP detector will also search for weakly interacting sub-GeV dark matter particles.

SHiP also plans to add information to the domain of tau neutrino physics. Out of the three neutrino flavors, the tau neutrino is the least studied by far, with only a handful of candidate events having been recorded. SHiP would deliver tens of thousands of tau and anti-tau neutrinos every year, bringing forward the era of tau neutrino phenomenology.

The BDF facility working group and SHiP collaboration have been working on delivering the physics output, notably by prototyping the detectors and conducting test beam campaigns for the various subsystems composing the experiment.

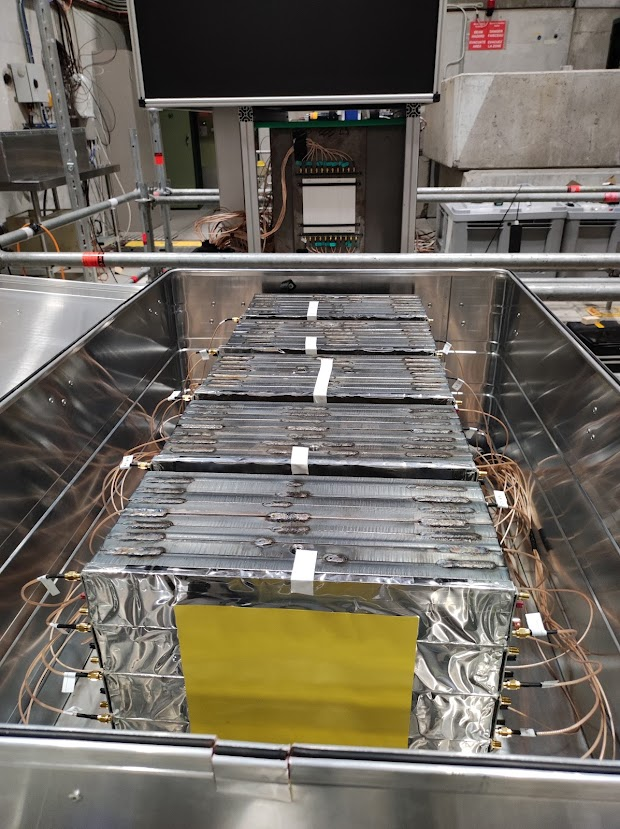
May 2025 SHiP Calorimeter system prototype at CERN SPS

== Facility ==
The Beam dump facility is designed to extract a very high proton flux from the CERN SPS, totaling $4 \times 10^{19}$ protons on target every year, orders of magnitude more interactions than any collider experiment. The beam is delivered onto a helium-cooled 1.5m thick tungsten target where the primary and cascade interactions occur, yielding a very large flux of heavy flavour particles such as B and D mesons. These particles may decay with very small branching fractions to new and unknown particles which would then be detected in the ensuing experiment.

== Upstream facilities ==
The SHiP upstream facilities are designed to filter out the intense flux of particles so as to allow the ensuing measurement to take place. They include a magnetized hadron absorber and a muon shield.

=== Magnetized hadron absorber ===
The magnetized hadron absorber is a 2m thick plate of magnetized iron designed to remove surviving hadronic debris from the target region. It allows to ensure that only muons and neutrinos pass into the experimental area.

=== Muon shield ===
The muon shield is a 20m long set of warm magnets designed to filter out the muons escaping the target region. $10^{11}$ muons per 1s SPS spill are reduced to $10^{5}$ muons after the muon shield.

== Scattering detector ==
The SHiP scattering detector enables it to observe extremely high neutrino fluxes of all flavours. It is articulated around a high granularity silicon tungsten section and a multi-purpose magnetised tracking calorimeter section made of iron, scintillating fibres and scintillator tiles. This allows SHiP to attain excellent sensitivity to both neutrino interactions and scattering dark matter, it will in particular see tens of thousands of tau neutrinos and antineutrinos whereas only a couple dozen were seen to this day.

== Background taggers ==
The SHiP Background taggers are responsible for ensuring pristine measurements devoid of background.

=== Upstream background tagger ===
The Upstream background tagger is made of a fast scintillator tile section and a precise straw tube section, enabling it to effectively flag background events in both space and time.

=== Surrounding background tagger ===
The Surrounding background tagger is a long, 50m detector constituted of cells filled with liquid scintillator and readout using wavelength-shifting-optical-modules. The cells attain sub-nanosecond resolution and allow to ensure that the decay region of SHiP remains clean from any uncounted event.

== SHiP signal detectors ==
=== SHiP spectrometer ===
SHiP measures new particle decays using a precision tracker made of gas-filled straw tubes which allows it to determine whether decays occur within the decay region. The $4 \times 6 m^{2}$ detector is thus capable of accurately spotting signals from charged particles and measuring their momentum thanks to a large magnet.

=== SHiP timing detector ===
SHiP creates time windows for readout using the timing detector which is a $4 \times 6 m^{2}$ detector made of scintillator bars. It allows the experiment to precisely measure the time of arrival of particles and thus ensure their correct matching to signal events.

=== SHiP Calorimeter system ===
The SHiP Calorimeter system fulfills a double responsibility: it first must ensure excellent particle identification capabilities so as to ensure the correct tagging of new physics signals. In addition, the calorimeter is tasked with the observation of neutral final states. It achieves this using the SplitCal concept: a segmented calorimeter articulated around High-Precision-Layers which grant it the ability to reconstruct the directionality of neutral particles which cannot be reconstructed by the spectrometer.

== Collaboration ==
The SHiP collaboration has 203 members from 34 institutes in 18 countries as of September 2025.
