= Itzhak Tserruya =

Israeli experimental nuclear physicist

- יצחק צרויה
- Prof. Itzhak Tserruya at a conference
- Alma mater: Technion – Israel Institute of Technology (BSc, MSc, PhD)
- Known for: CERES/NA45; low-mass dilepton measurements; Hadron Blind Detectors; PHENIX
- Awards: Honorary Doctor of JINR (2020); Fellow of the American Physical Society (2023)
- Scientific career
- Fields: Experimental nuclear physics, relativistic heavy-ion physics
- Workplaces: Weizmann Institute of Science

Itzhak Tserruya is an Israeli experimental nuclear physicist and professor emeritus in the Department of Particle Physics and Astrophysics at the Weizmann Institute of Science in Rehovot. His research centers on ultra-relativistic heavy-ion collisions and the quark–gluon plasma, and in particular on the use of electron–positron pairs (dileptons) as probes of deconfinement and chiral symmetry restoration. He was the spokesperson of the CERES/NA45 experiment at CERN and led the development of the Hadron Blind Detector for the PHENIX experiment at the Relativistic Heavy Ion Collider (RHIC).

== Career and research ==
Tserruya spent his career at the Weizmann Institute of Science, where he is now a professor emeritus. Since the late 1980s his work has focused on ultra-relativistic heavy-ion collisions as a means of producing and studying the quark–gluon plasma.

=== CERES/NA45 ===
Tserruya served as spokesperson of the CERES/NA45 collaboration, a fixed-target experiment at the CERN Super Proton Synchrotron (SPS) built specifically to measure low-mass electron–positron pairs in nuclear collisions. The experiment's spectrometer was based on a pair of ring-imaging Cherenkov (RICH) detectors that were insensitive to most hadrons, the first realization of the "hadron blind" detector concept.

In lead–gold collisions at 158 GeV per nucleon, CERES observed a significant excess of electron pairs in the invariant-mass range of about 0.25–0.7 GeV/c^{2} over the yield expected from known hadron decays; the enhancement was concentrated at low transverse momentum and grew faster than linearly with particle multiplicity. A comparable and somewhat larger excess was later found at 40 GeV per nucleon. The enhancement was interpreted in terms of in-medium modification of the ρ meson spectral function, connected to chiral symmetry restoration.

=== PHENIX and the Hadron Blind Detector ===
Tserruya's group later extended electron-pair measurements to the much higher energies of RHIC at Brookhaven National Laboratory, working in the PHENIX collaboration. The group led the design and construction of the PC1 pad chambers, part of the PHENIX tracking system, and of a Hadron Blind Detector (HBD) built to suppress the large combinatorial background in low-mass pair measurements. The HBD was a windowless Cherenkov detector filled with pure CF_{4}, with a 50 cm radiator coupled directly to a triple-GEM stack carrying a CsI photocathode. It was commissioned in 2007 and fully operational from late 2008. Tserruya was the corresponding author of the detector's design and performance paper. PHENIX observed an enhancement of low-mass dielectrons in gold–gold collisions that could be described in the same in-medium ρ-meson framework used for the CERES data.

=== NICA ===
More recently Tserruya has worked on experiments at the NICA facility at the Joint Institute for Nuclear Research (JINR) in Dubna, Russia, and is a co-author on publications of the MPD and BM@N collaborations.

== Service ==
Tserruya has chaired the JINR Programme Advisory Committee for Particle Physics, and has chaired the Israel Committee for Nuclear Physics. In 2013 he co-chaired the heavy-ion panel of the United States Department of Energy Nuclear Physics Comparative Research Review.

== Honors and awards ==
- Honorary Doctor of JINR (17 September 2020), awarded for his contributions to science and to training young scientists.
- Fellow of the American Physical Society (2023), nominated by the Division of Nuclear Physics, for sustained leadership in studying the quark–gluon plasma with electromagnetic probes and for developing hadron-blind detectors.

== Selected publications ==
- CERES/NA45 Collaboration (G. Agakichiev et al.) (1995). "Enhanced production of low-mass electron pairs in 200 GeV/u S-Au collisions at the CERN SPS". Physical Review Letters. 75 (7): 1272–1275. doi:10.1103/PhysRevLett.75.1272. PMID 10060251.
- Tserruya, I. (1997). "Dileptons and Photons at the CERN SPS". Progress of Theoretical Physics Supplement. 129: 145–160. arXiv:nucl-ex/9801007. Bibcode:1997PThPS.129..145T. doi:10.1143/PTPS.129.145.
- Anderson, W.; et al. (2011). "Design, Construction, Operation and Performance of a Hadron Blind Detector for the PHENIX Experiment". Nuclear Instruments and Methods in Physics Research A. 646: 35–58. arXiv:1103.4277. Bibcode:2011NIMPA.646...35A. doi:10.1016/j.nima.2011.04.015.
- Tserruya, I.; Aoki, K.; Woody, C. (2020). "Hadron blind Cherenkov counters". Nuclear Instruments and Methods in Physics Research Section A: Accelerators, Spectrometers, Detectors and Associated Equipment. 970 163765. arXiv:2003.12858. Bibcode:2020NIMPA.97063765T. doi:10.1016/j.nima.2020.163765.
