= Direct photon =

Produced in hadronic collisions, a direct photon is any real photon which originates directly from an electromagnetic vertex in a quark-quark, quark-gluon or gluon-gluon scattering subprocess (as opposed to "indirect" photons which arise from the decays of fragmentation products).

Because the QCD calculations for direct photon production are considerably easier to perform than for other processes studies of direct photons have been used to test predictions made by perturbative QCD.

Direct photons were predicted to exist by C.O. Escobar in 1975 and were first observed by the R412 group at the Intersecting Storage Rings at CERN in 1976, and were subsequently studied by various experiments, including E705 and E706 at Fermilab, NA3, NA24, WA70 and UA6 at the CERN SPS as well as UA1 and UA2 at the CERN SPPS collider.
