= John Gordon Rushbrooke =

Australian particle physicist (1936–2003)

John Gordon Rushbrooke (1936–2003) was an Australian particle physicist.

The son of Neil and Vera Rushbrooke, with four sisters, Rushbrooke was born in Geelong in 1936 and was brought up there. He attended Geelong Grammar School, where he was at the top of every class.

Rushbrooke went on to Trinity College in Perth, graduating with a BSc in 1956. This was followed by a master's degree at Australia's first cyclotron, where he began his work as a high-energy physicist. His thesis from the University of Melbourne was on Coulomb excitations of the atom.

In 1959 Rushbrooke won a scholarship that took him to King's College, Cambridge. Following work at the Cavendish Laboratory and completion of his PhD, Rushbrooke spent a year at CERN in Geneva before returning to Cambridge to take up a fellowship at Downing College as director of studies in physics.

For five years from 1977 he was on leave from his duties at Cambridge, based again at CERN, where he became the spokesperson for the UA5 collaboration. The UA5 experiment searched for Centauro events at the Proton-Antiproton Collider, a modification of the Super Proton Synchrotron.

In 1983 Rushbrooke was promoted to a readership in physics at Cambridge, and in 1991 the university conferred on him a second doctorate. During the 1990s Rushbrooke worked on commercializing technology from scanning techniques developed at CERN. He moved to California in 2000 after securing a contract with a major US company.

Rushbrooke died in California in 2003, at the age of 67.
