= WA70 experiment =

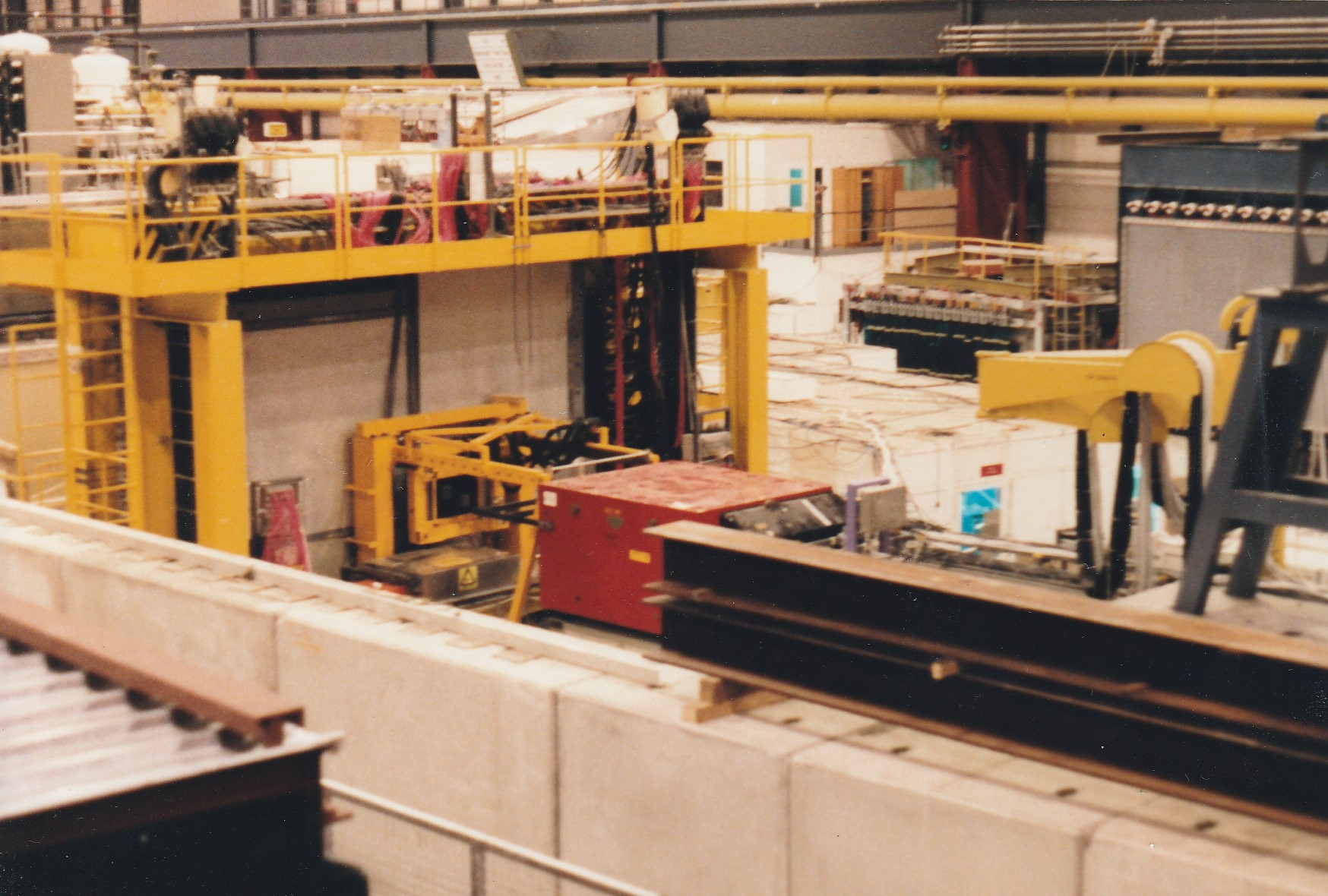
The WA70 calorimeter viewed from downstream of the beam line. Photo by R.W. Poultney 1986

The WA70 experiment was a collaboration between the Universities of Geneva, Glasgow, Liverpool, Milan and Neuchatel using the facilities of the OMEGA spectrometer at CERN.

The purpose of the experiment was to study direct photons produced in proton-proton and proton-pion collisions within a fixed target of liquid hydrogen at the CERN SPS. The experiment was proposed on 6 August 1980 and formally approved on 22 October 1981. Preliminary data was taken in 1983 with physics runs in 1984, 1985 and 1986.

A novel feature of the experiment was a liquid scintillator calorimeter, which was built in quadrants and designed to measure the energy of direct photons and other particles produced by the collisions. This was situated downstream of the liquid hydrogen target.

Results were presented at scientific conferences and published in scientific journals. The measured cross section for direct photon production was in agreement with predictions from perturbative QCD.

The spokesperson for the experiment was Professor Michel Martin, and participants included Dr. Fabiola Gianotti (who went on to become CERN's first woman Director General).
