= Piyare Jain =

American physicist (1921–2019)

Dr. Piyare L. Jain
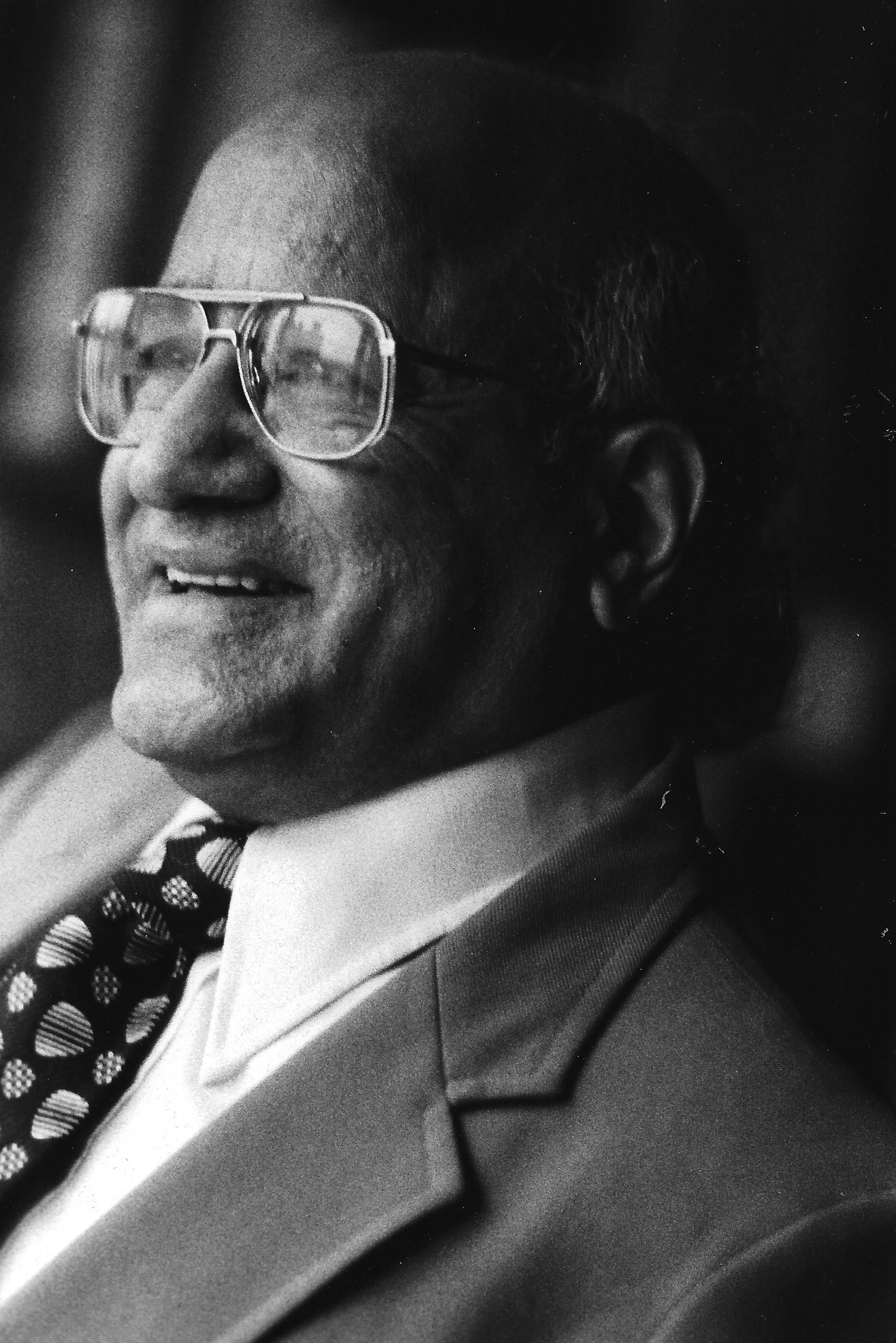
- Born: December 11, 1921; Hoshiarpur, Punjab, India
- Died: October 28, 2019 (aged 97); Buffalo, New York, U.S.
- Occupation: Physicist

Piyare Lal Jain (December 11, 1921 – October 28, 2019) was a particle physicist at University at Buffalo. On December 6, 2006, he claimed the discovery of the long-sought axion subatomic particle.

== Biography ==
On December 6, 2006, he claimed discovery of the long-sought axion subatomic particle.

The discovery involved Jain's use of 3-dimensional photographic medium targets in heavy-ion particle accelerators; modern detectors using electronic sensors were unable to detect the axion due to the very short distances and times involved, but the physical medium was able to identify about 1,200 Axion traces over years of experiment. Jain was one of the few working physicists with experience with that type of detector, which had been largely abandoned in favor of the modern electronic detectors.

He was born in India, and received his M.A. at Punjab University in 1948 and his Ph.D. at Michigan State University in 1954.
