= UA4 experiment =

Particle physics experiment at CERN

Super Proton–Antiproton Synchrotron (Spp̅S)
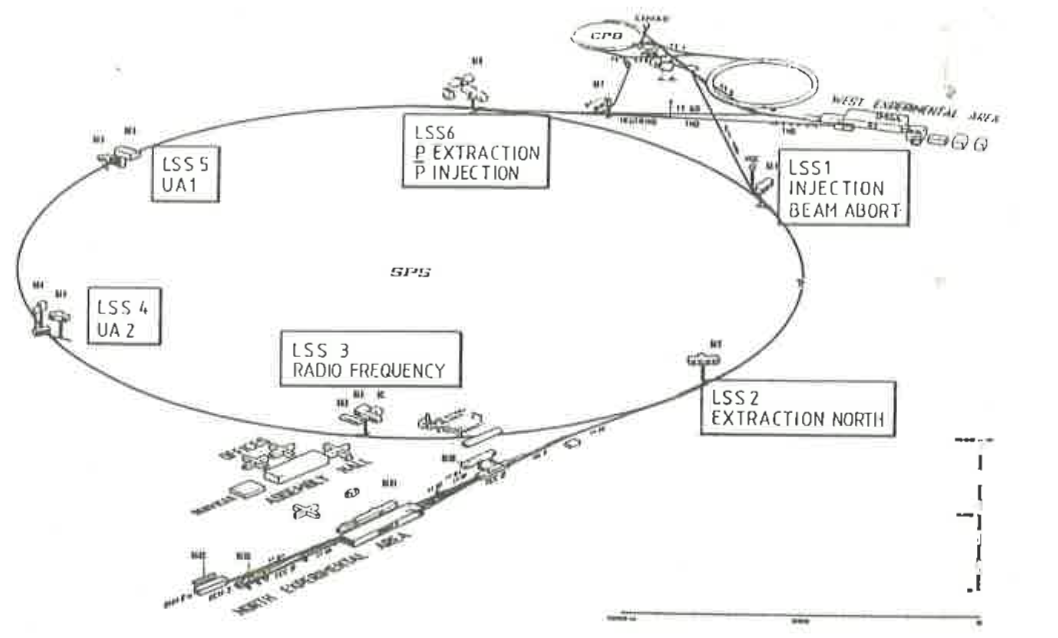

Key Spp̅S Experiments
- UA1: Underground Area 1
- UA2: Underground Area 2
- UA4: Underground Area 4
- UA5: Underground Area 5

Spp̅S pre-accelerators
- PS: Proton Synchrotron
- AA: Antiproton Accumulator

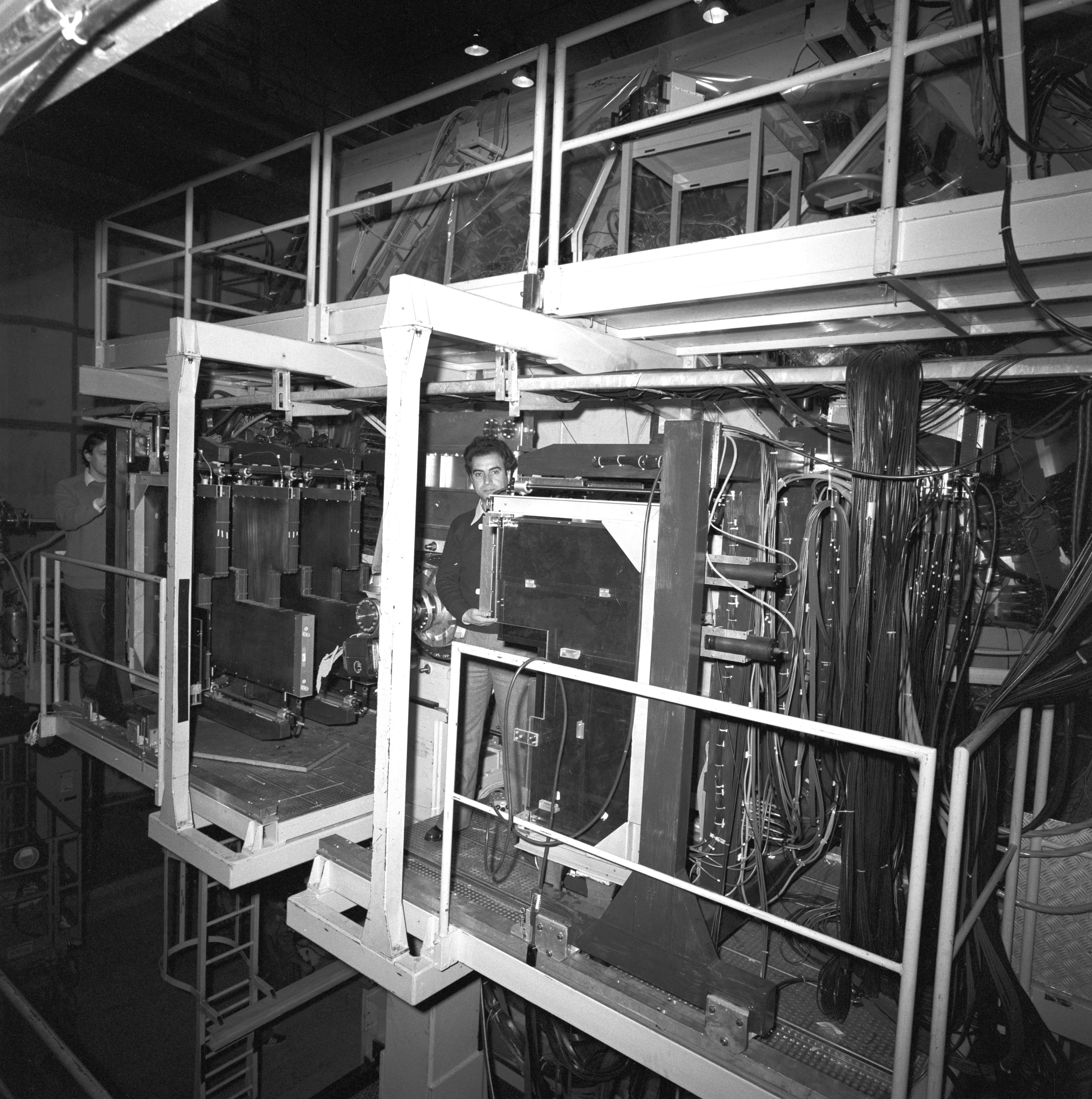
UA4 experimental setup, CERN, April 1982: The experiment measured elastic scattering and total cross-section at the Proton-Antiproton Collider.

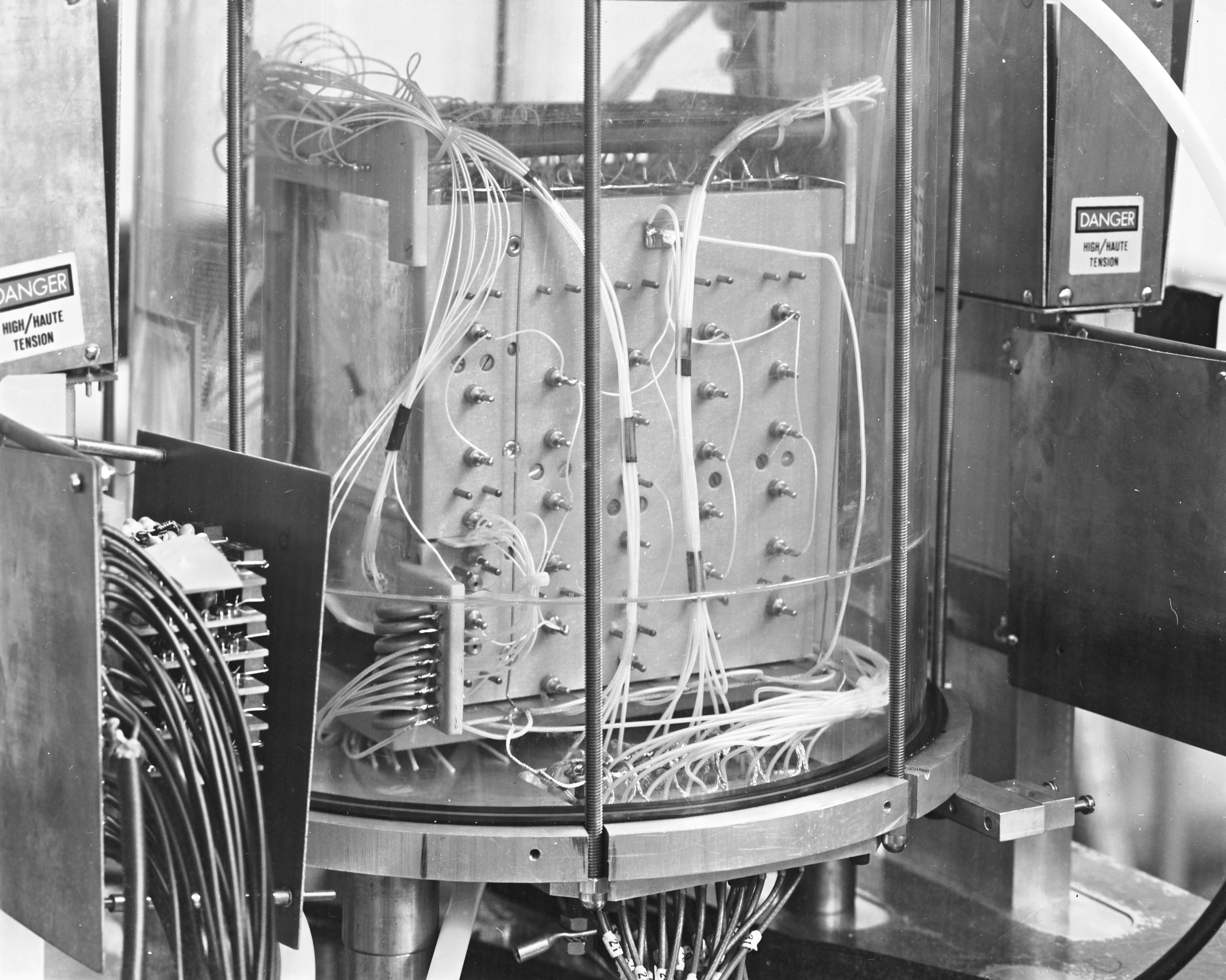
Wire chamber roman-pot for experiment UA4, CERN, Jan 1980

UA4 experiment (COULOMB) was a high-energy physics experiment at the Proton-Antiproton Collider at CERN. The UA4 collaboration consisted of physicists from Amsterdam, Genova, Napoli, Pisa, Roma, California and CERN. UA4 was approved on 18 January 1979, and the first phase of data taking lasted until 17 June 1985. The spokesperson of UA4 was Giorgi Matthiae.

UA4 was followed by UA4/2, a collaboration between Genova, Roma, Paris, Prague, Valencia and CERN. The purpose of UA4/2 was to measure the ratio of real to the imaginary part of the forward elastic scattering amplitude. It was approved in July 1990, and recorded data throughout 1991.

The objective of the UA4 experiment was to measure the antiproton-proton cross-section, in order to show that cross-sections rising with energy are a characteristic of strong interaction. One had previously measured proton-antiproton cross-sections at the Intersecting Storage Rings, but as the Proton-Antiproton Collider — a modification of the Super Proton Synchrotron — began operating, the measurements could be done in a new energy range: up to 540 GeV center-of-mass energy.

Elastic events were detected by high resolution wire chambers and scintillation-counter hodoscopes. A system of drift chamber telescopes and counter telescopes were placed on the left and the right side of the crossing region to detect inelastic events.

After the period of data taking, the UA4 collaboration could conclude that proton-antiproton cross-section indeed rises with energy.

== See also ==
- List of Super Proton Synchrotron experiments
- UA1 experiment
- UA2 experiment
