= Sheldon Datz =

American chemist (1927–2001)

Sheldon Datz (July 21, 1927 – August 15, 2001) was an American chemist. Born in New York City as the son of Clara and Jacob Datz, he went to Stuyvesant High School and received a degree in chemistry from Columbia University and the University of Tennessee. Along with Dr. Ellison Taylor, Datz was an early contributor to the invention of the molecular beam technique, for which Dudley R. Herschbach, Yuan T. Lee and John Charles Polanyi later won the Nobel Prize in Chemistry. He shared the Fermi Award in 2000 with Sidney Drell and Herbert York.

Datz served in the U.S. Navy and moved to Oak Ridge, Tennessee upon the opening of federal nuclear facilities there after the Second World War. He married Roslyn Gordon Datz and fathered two children: William (Bill) Datz and Joan Ellen Datz Green. They divorced, and Sheldon later married Jonna Holm Datz of Denmark.

== Awards ==
- 1998 Davisson-Germer Prize in Atomic or Surface Physics
- 2000 Enrico Fermi Award
