= D meson =

Particle in physics

- Composition: D^{+}: cd̅; D^{−}: dc̅; D^{0}: cu̅; D̅^{0}: uc̅; D^{+}_{s}: cs̅; D^{−}_{s}: sc̅
- Statistics: Bosonic
- Family: Mesons
- Interactions: Strong, weak, electromagnetic, gravitational
- Symbol: D^{+}, D^{−}, D^{0}, D̅^{0}, D^{+}_{s}, D^{−}_{s}
- Antiparticle: D^{+}: D^{−}; D^{0}: D̅^{0}; D^{+}_{s}: D^{−}_{s}
- Discovered: SLAC (1976)
- Mass: D^{±}: 1869.62±0.20 MeV/c^{2}; D^{0},D̅^{0}: 1864.84±0.17 MeV/c^{2}; D^{±}_{s}: 1968.47±0.33 MeV/c^{2}
- Mean lifetime: D^{±}: (1.040±0.007)×10^{−12} s; D^{0},D̅^{0}: (4.101±0.015)×10^{−13} s; D^{±}_{s}: (5.00±0.07)×10^{−13} s
- Electric charge: D^{±},D^{±}_{s}: ±1 e; D^{0},D̅^{0}: 0 e
- Spin: 0 ħ
- Strangeness: D^{±},D^{0},D̅^{0}: 0; D^{±}_{s}: ±1
- Charm: +1
- Isospin: D^{+},D̅^{0}: +1/2; D^{−},D^{0}: −1/2; D^{±}_{s}: 0
- Parity: −1

The D mesons are the lightest particles that contain charm quarks. They are often studied to gain knowledge on the weak interaction. The strange D mesons (D_{s}) were called "F mesons" prior to 1986.

== Overview ==
The D mesons were discovered in 1976 by the Mark I detector at the Stanford Linear Accelerator Center.

Since the D mesons are the lightest mesons containing a single charm quark (or antiquark), they must change the charm (anti)quark into an (anti)quark of another type to decay. Such transitions involve a change of the internal charm quantum number, and can take place only via the weak interaction. In D mesons, the charm quark preferentially changes into a strange quark via an exchange of a W particle, therefore the D meson preferentially decays into kaons (K) and pions (π).

== List of D mesons ==
D mesons
Particle name	Particle symbol	Antiparticle symbol	Quark content	Rest mass [MeV/c^{2}]	I	J^{P}	S	C	B′	Mean lifetime [s]	Commonly decays to (>5% of decays)
Charged D meson	D^{+}	D^{−}	cd̅	1869.62±0.20	1/2	0^{−}	0	+1	0	(1.040±0.007)×10^{−12}	
Neutral D meson	D^{0}	D̅^{0}	cu̅	1864.84±0.17	1/2	0^{−}	0	+1	0	(4.101±0.015)×10^{−13}	
Strange D meson	D^{+}_{s}	D^{−}_{s}	cs̅	1968.47±0.33	0	0^{−}	+1	+1	0	(5.00±0.07)×10^{−13}	
Excited charged D meson	D^{∗+}(2010)	D^{∗−}(2010)	cd̅	2010.27±0.17	1/2	1^{−}	0	+1	0	(6.9±1.9)×10^{−21}^{^{‡}}	D^{0} + π^{+} or D^{+} + π^{0}
Excited neutral D meson	D^{∗0}(2007)	D̅^{∗0}(2007)	cu̅	2006.97±0.19	1/2	1^{−}	0	+1	0	> 3.1×10^{−22}^{^{‡}}	D^{0} + π^{0} or D^{0} + γ

‡ PDG reports the resonance width ($\Gamma$). Here the conversion $\tau = {\hbar}/{\Gamma}$ is given instead.

== CP violation ==
In 2019, an analysis by the LHCb experiment reported the first observation of CP violation in the decays of the neutral D^{0} meson, with a significance of over five standard deviations. The results of a subsequent data analysis by the same collaboration was presented in 2022, which announced that they found evidence of direct CP violation in the decay of the D^{0} meson into pions.

== D–D̅ oscillations ==
In 2021 it was confirmed with a significance of more than seven standard deviations, that the neutral D^{0} meson spontaneously transforms into its own antiparticle and back. This phenomenon is called flavor oscillation and was prior known to exist in the neutral K meson and B meson.

== See also ==
- List of mesons
- List of particles
- Timeline of particle discoveries
