= Hodoscope =

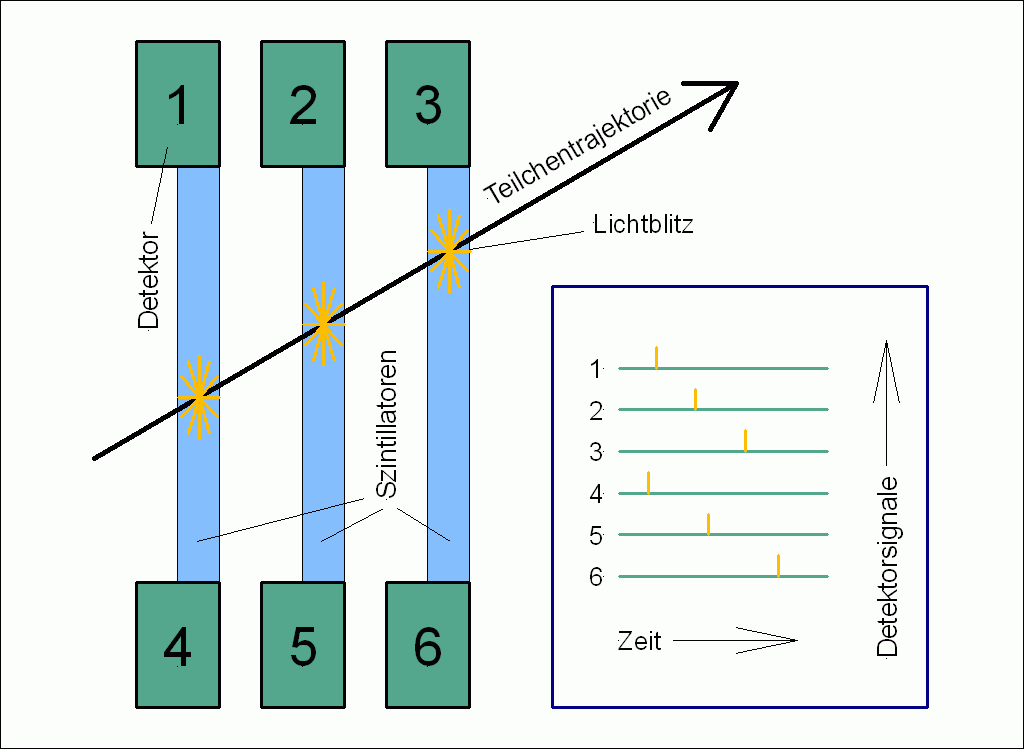

A hodoscope (from the Greek "hodos" for way or path, and "skopos" an observer) is an instrument used in particle detectors to detect passing charged particles and determine their trajectories. Hodoscopes are characterized by being made up of many segments; the combination of which segments record a detection is then used to infer where the particle passed through hodoscope. Hodoscopes are among the oldest particle track detecting technology, having been employed as long ago as 1933 as a cosmic ray telescope.

The typical detector segment is a piece of scintillating material, which emits light when a particle passes through it. The scintillation light can be converted to an electrical signal either by a photomultiplier tube (PMT) or a PIN diode. If a segment measures some significant amount of light, the experimenter can infer that a particle passed through that segment. In addition to coordinate information, for some systems the strength of the light can be proportional to the deposited energy. By doing necessary calibrations, the deposited energy can be determined, which then can be used to infer information about the original particle's energy.

As an example: a simple hodoscope might be used to determine where a particle crossed a plane or a wall. In this case, the experimenter could use two segments shaped like strips, arranged in two layers. One layer of strips could be arranged horizontally, while a second layer could be arranged vertically. A particle passing through the wall would hit a strip in each layer; the vertical strip would reveal the particle's horizontal position when it crossed the wall, while the horizontal strip would indicate the particle's vertical position.

Hodoscopes are some of the simplest detectors for tracking charged particles. However, their spatial resolution is limited by the segment size. In applications where the spatial resolution is very important, hodoscopes have been superseded by other detectors such as drift chambers and time projection chambers.

Many high-energy particle physics experiments take advantage of scintillating fibers or bars of scintillating polymers as a source of particle tracks. LHCb employs a complex scintillating fiber system in the SciFi particle tracker, with 0.25mm fiber spacing. Other accelerator-based experiments employ hodoscopes for particle calorimetry or tracking, for example the BM@N Heavy Ion Experiment and the Light Dark Matter eXperiment (LDMX).
