= NA60 experiment =

Particle physics experiment

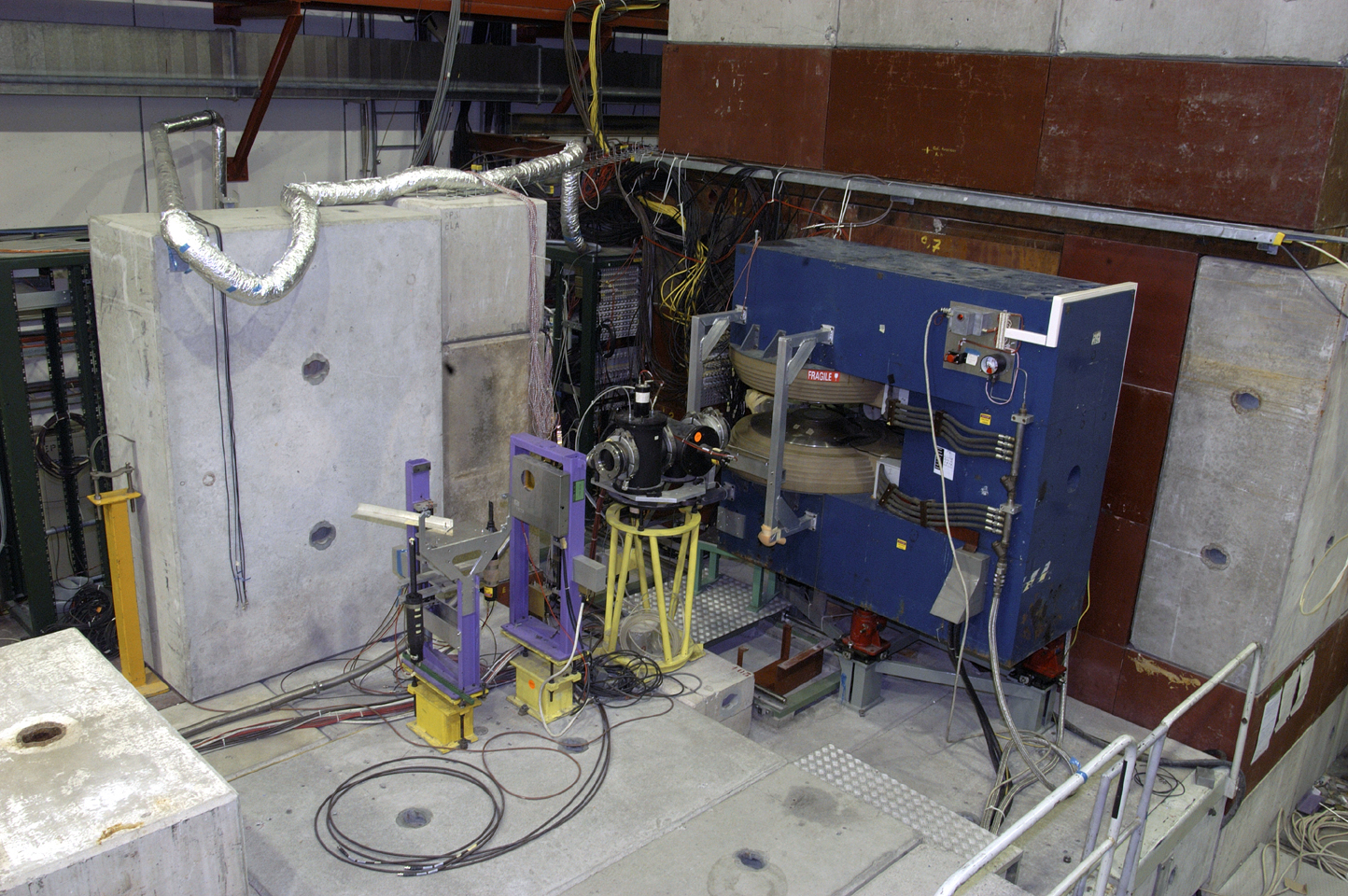
NA60 experiment in CERN hall B911

The NA60 experiment was a high energy heavy ions experiment at the CERN Super Proton Synchrotron. It studied "prompt dimuon and charm production with proton and heavy ion beams". The spokesperson for the experiment was Gianluca Usai. The experiment was proposed on 7 March 2000 and accepted on 15 June 2000. The experiment ran from October 2001 to 15 November 2004.
