= Trigger (particle physics) =

In particle physics, a trigger is a system that uses criteria to rapidly decide which events in a particle detector to keep when only a small fraction of the total can be recorded. Trigger systems are necessary due to real-world limitations in computing power, data storage capacity and rates. Since experiments are typically searching for "interesting" events (such as decays of rare particles) that occur at a relatively low rate, trigger systems are used to identify the events that should be recorded for later analysis. Current accelerators have event rates greater than 1 MHz and trigger rates that can be below 10 Hz. The ratio of the trigger rate to the event rate is referred to as the selectivity of the trigger. For example, the Large Hadron Collider (LHC) has an event rate of 40 MHz (4·10^{7} Hz), and the Higgs boson is expected to be produced there at a rate of roughly 1 Hz. The LHC detectors can manage to permanently store about one thousand events per second. Therefore, the minimum selectivity required is 10^{−5}, with much stricter requirements for the data analysis afterwards.

== See also ==
- ATLAS trigger system
- CMS trigger
