= UA5 experiment =

Particle physics experiment at CERN

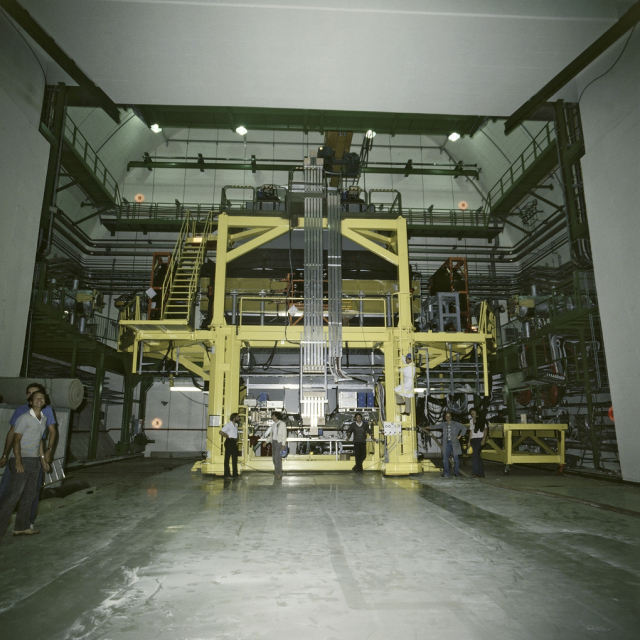
The streamer chamber of UA5, which had been operating at the Intersecting Storage Rings until Easter, was installed in its platform, alongside the UA2 detector and in September 1981 was moved into the beam

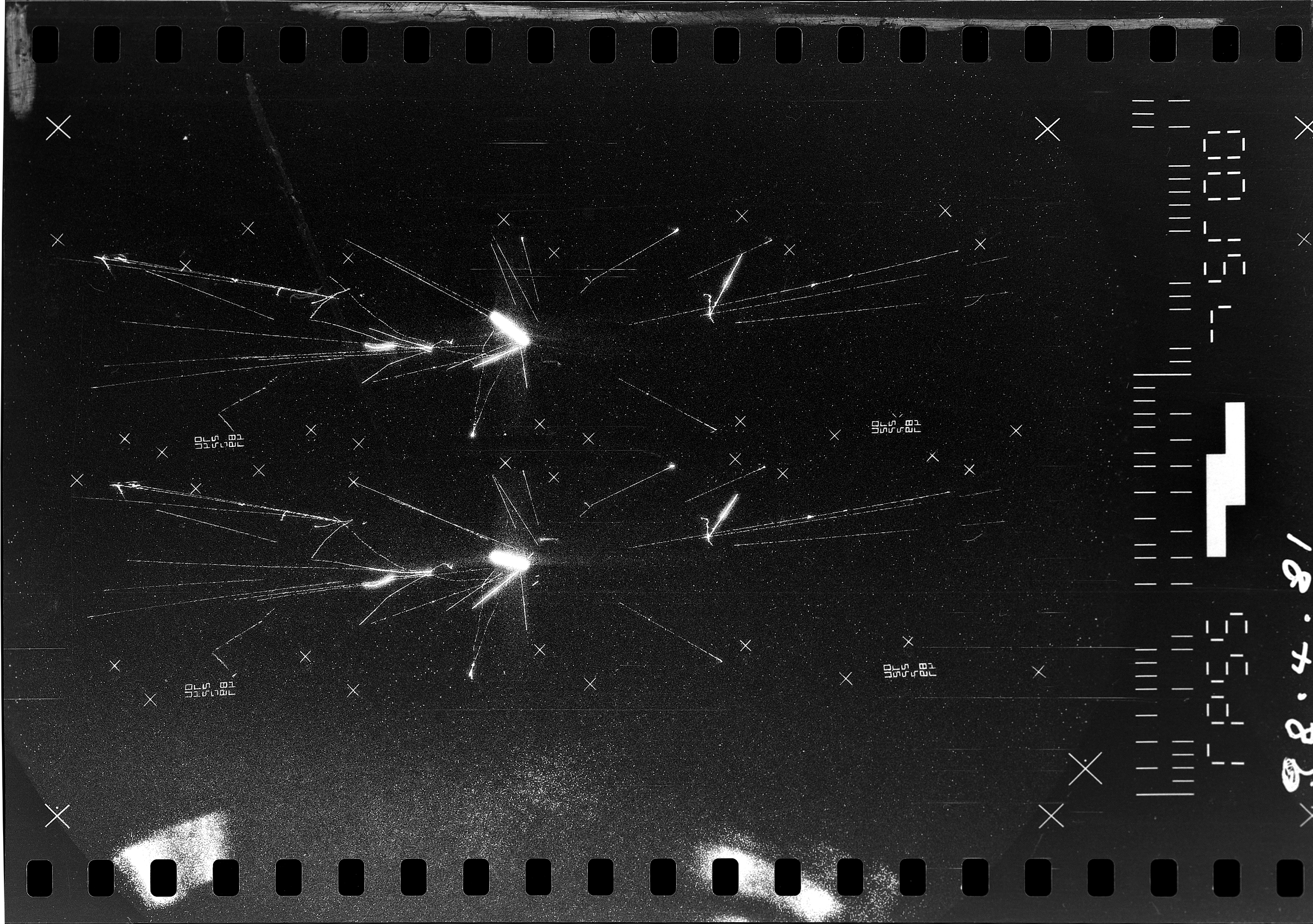
First proton-antiproton collider interactions as seen by the streamer chamber of UA5 in April 1981, CERN

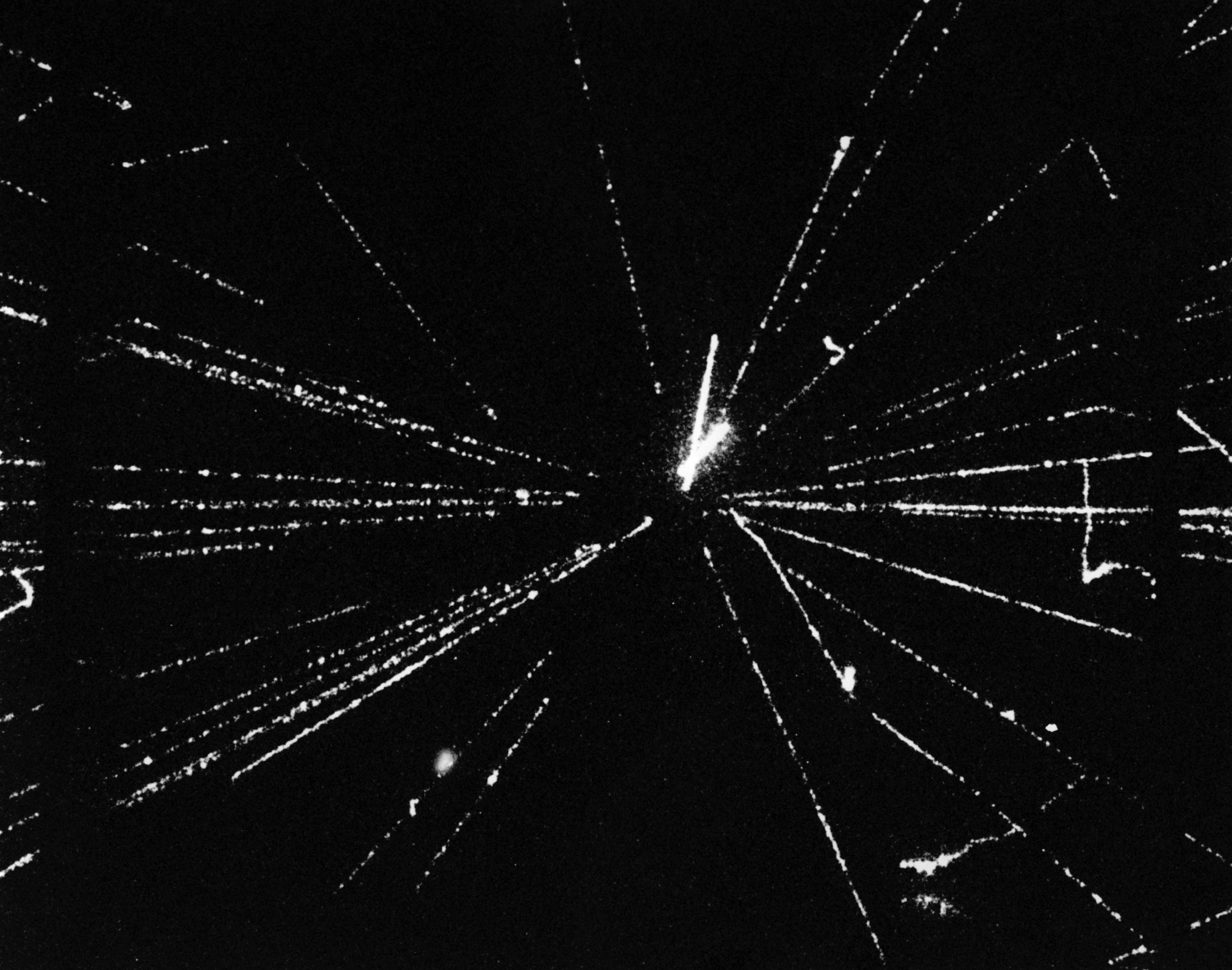
Closeup of typical proton-antiproton interaction, as recorded in 1982

The UA5 experiment was the first experiment conducted at the Proton-Antiproton Collider (Spp̅S), a collider using the infrastructure of the Super Proton Synchrotron (SPS). The experiment was approved in February 1979, as a collaboration between CERN and the universities of Bonn, Brussels, Cambridge and Stockholm. The spokesperson of the UA5 collaboration was John Rushbrooke.

The object of the experiment was to investigate Centauro events and more generally to perform a first rapid visual survey of the energy region afforded by the then new SPS collider. Measurements were done on proton-antiproton collisions of 540 GeV center-of-mass energy, with the results being published in November 1983. Later, under the name of UA5/2, data was recorded from 900 GeV collisions. No indication of Centauro production was observed, but an upper limit on the production was obtained.

The experimental setup consisted of two large streamer chambers which were placed above and below the Spp̅S beam pipe. The chambers were triggered by requiring hits in scintillation counters at each end. This trigger rejected essentially all elastic and diffractive elements. The streamer chamber tracks were photographed by six cameras, and the tracks were measured, reconstructed and analyzed.

== See also ==
- List of Super Proton Synchrotron experiments
- UA1 experiment
- UA2 experiment
