= Gas electron multiplier =

Type of gaseous ionization detector

A gas electron multiplier (GEM) is a type of gaseous ionization detector used in nuclear and particle physics and radiation detection.

All gaseous ionization detectors are able to collect the electrons released by ionizing radiation, guiding them to a region with a large electric field, and thereby initiating an electron avalanche. The avalanche is able to produce enough electrons to create a current or charge large enough to be detected by electronics. In most ionization detectors, the large field comes from a thin wire with a positive high-voltage potential; this same thin wire collects the electrons from the avalanche and guides them towards the readout electronics. GEMs create the large electric field in small holes in a thin polymer sheet; the avalanche occurs inside of these holes. The resulting electrons are ejected from the sheet, and a separate system must be used to collect the electrons and guide them towards the readout.

GEMs are one of the class of micropattern gaseous detectors; this class includes micromegas and other technologies.

== History ==
GEMs were invented in 1997 in the Gas Detector Development Group at CERN by physicist Fabio Sauli.

== Operation ==
Typical GEMs are constructed of 50–70 micrometre thick Kapton foil clad in copper on both sides. A photolithography and acid etching process makes 30–50 micrometer diameter holes through both copper layers; a second etching process extends these holes all the way through the kapton. The small holes can be made very regular and dimensionally stable. For operation, a voltage of 150–400 V is placed across the two copper layers, making large electric fields in the holes. Under these conditions, in the presence of appropriate gases, a single electron entering any hole will create an avalanche containing 100–1000 electrons; this is the "gain" of the GEM. Since the electrons exit the back of the GEM, a second GEM placed after the first one will provide an additional stage of amplification. Many experiments use double- or triple-GEM stacks to achieve gains of one million or more.

Operation of wire chambers typically involved only one voltage setting: the voltage on the wire provided both the drift field and the amplification field. A GEM-based detector requires several independent voltage settings: a drift voltage to guide electrons from the ionization point to the GEM, an amplification voltage, and an extraction/transfer voltage to guide electrons from the GEM exit to the readout plane. A detector with a large drift region can be operated as a time projection chamber; a detector with a smaller drift region operates as a simple proportional counter.

A GEM chamber can be read-out by simple conductive strips laid across a flat plane; the readout plane, like the GEM itself, can be fabricated with ordinary lithography techniques on ordinary circuit board materials. Since the readout strips are not involved in the amplification process, they can be made in any shape; 2-D strips and grids, hexagonal pads, radial/azimuthal segments, and other readout geometries are possible.

== Uses ==
GEMs have been used in many types of particle physics experiments. One notable early user was the COMPASS experiment at CERN. GEM-based gas detectors have been proposed for components of the International Linear Collider, the STAR experiment and PHENIX experiment at the Relativistic Heavy Ion Collider, and others. The advantages of GEMs, compared to multi-wire proportional chambers, include: ease of manufacturing, since large-area GEMs can in principle be mass-produced, while wire chambers require labor-intensive and error-prone assembly; flexible geometry, both for the GEM and the readout pads; and suppression of positive ions, which was a source of field distortions in time-projection chambers operated at high rates. A number of manufacturing difficulties plagued early GEMs, including non-uniformity and short circuits, but these have to a large extent been resolved. ALICE experiment's time projection chamber has been running with GEM amplification instead of the original multi-wire proportional chambers since late 2021.
