= John Riley Holt =

English physicist (1918–2009)

John Riley Holt, FRS (15 February 1918 – 6 January 2009) was an English experimental physicist who played a part in the development of the atom bomb and later became one of the pioneers of elementary particle physics research.

== Early life and education ==
Holt was born in Runcorn, Cheshire, England, in 1918, his father being a worker in a boatbuilding yard, and his mother the owner of a bakery and confectionery shop. He was educated in Runcorn and in 1934 at age 16 became an undergraduate in the physics department at the University of Liverpool. The following year James Chadwick was appointed Professor of Physics at the university, shortly after he had been awarded the Nobel Prize in Physics for proving the existence of the neutron. During the time that Holt was a student, Chadwick built a cyclotron, then a newly invented research tool, in the physics department. Holt graduated with first class honours in 1938 and won the Oliver Lodge Prize. Chadwick took him on as a research student describing him as "the best research student he had ever supervised".

== Career and research ==
During the Second World War, Chadwick formed a team, which included Holt, to perform measurements, some of which involved the cyclotron, to confirm the findings in the Frisch–Peierls memorandum relating to the critical mass required for an atomic bomb. Some of the experiments were performed in a Liverpool Underground station during the Liverpool blitz. This work led to Holt completing his PhD in 1941. The thesis describes his work on artificial radioactivity, but his findings on uranium, which related to the bomb, were not released for security reasons. Holt's work played a part in proving the feasibility of the production of a nuclear weapon.

Following the war, Holt was appointed lecturer at the University of Liverpool in 1946 and Professor of Experimental Physics in 1966. He was involved with the design of a larger cyclotron and in 1949, with C. T. Young discovered low-energy deuteron stripping. Using the more powerful synchrocyclotron, Holt's team carried out experiments on the weak interaction responsible for the decay of the muon, which played a large part in the current understanding of the Standard Model. In the early 1960s, Holt was involved with the design of the electromagnets for the electron synchrotron at Daresbury Laboratory and in 1964 he was elected a Fellow of the Royal Society. In the 1970s and 1980s he led the Liverpool group in the European Muon Collaboration at CERN. This group investigated proton structure and discovered that proton spin was not carried by the valence quarks, which overturned the previous predictions. Holt retired in 1983.
