= COMPASS experiment =

Particle physics experiment

Super Proton Synchrotron (SPS)

Key SPS Experiments
- UA1: Underground Area 1
- UA2: Underground Area 2
- NA31: NA31 Experiment
- NA32: Investigation of Charm Production in Hadronic Interactions Using High-Resolution Silicon Detectors
- COMPASS: Common Muon and Proton Apparatus for Structure and Spectroscopy
- SHINE: SPS Heavy Ion and Neutrino Experiment
- NA62: NA62 Experiment

SPS preaccelerators
- p and Pb: Linear accelerators for protons (Linac 2) and Lead (Linac 3)
- (not marked): Proton Synchrotron Booster
- PS: Proton Synchrotron

The NA58 experiment, or COMPASS (standing for "Common Muon and Proton Apparatus for Structure and Spectroscopy") is a 60-metre-long fixed-target experiment at the M2 beam line of the SPS at CERN. The experimental hall is located at the CERN North Area, close to the French village of Prévessin-Moëns. The experiment is a two-staged spectrometer with numerous tracking detectors, particle identification and calorimetry. The physics results are extracted by recording and analysing the final states of the scattering processes.

COMPASS experiment logo

The versatile set-up, the use of different targets and particle beams allow the investigation of various processes. The main physics goals are the investigation of the nucleon spin structure and hadron spectroscopy. The collaboration consists of 220 physicists from 13 different countries, involving 28 universities and research institutes.

== History and physics goals ==
The COMPASS experiment was proposed in 1996 and approved by the CERN research committee. Between 1999 and 2001, the experiment was set up and finally in 2001, the first commissioning run was performed. Until the start of the LHC experiments, COMPASS was the largest data-taking experiment at CERN. It is also a pioneer in adopting new detector and readout technologies, such as MicroMegas, GEM detectors and most recently THGEM photon detection. The data taking is divided into the COMPASS I and II phases.

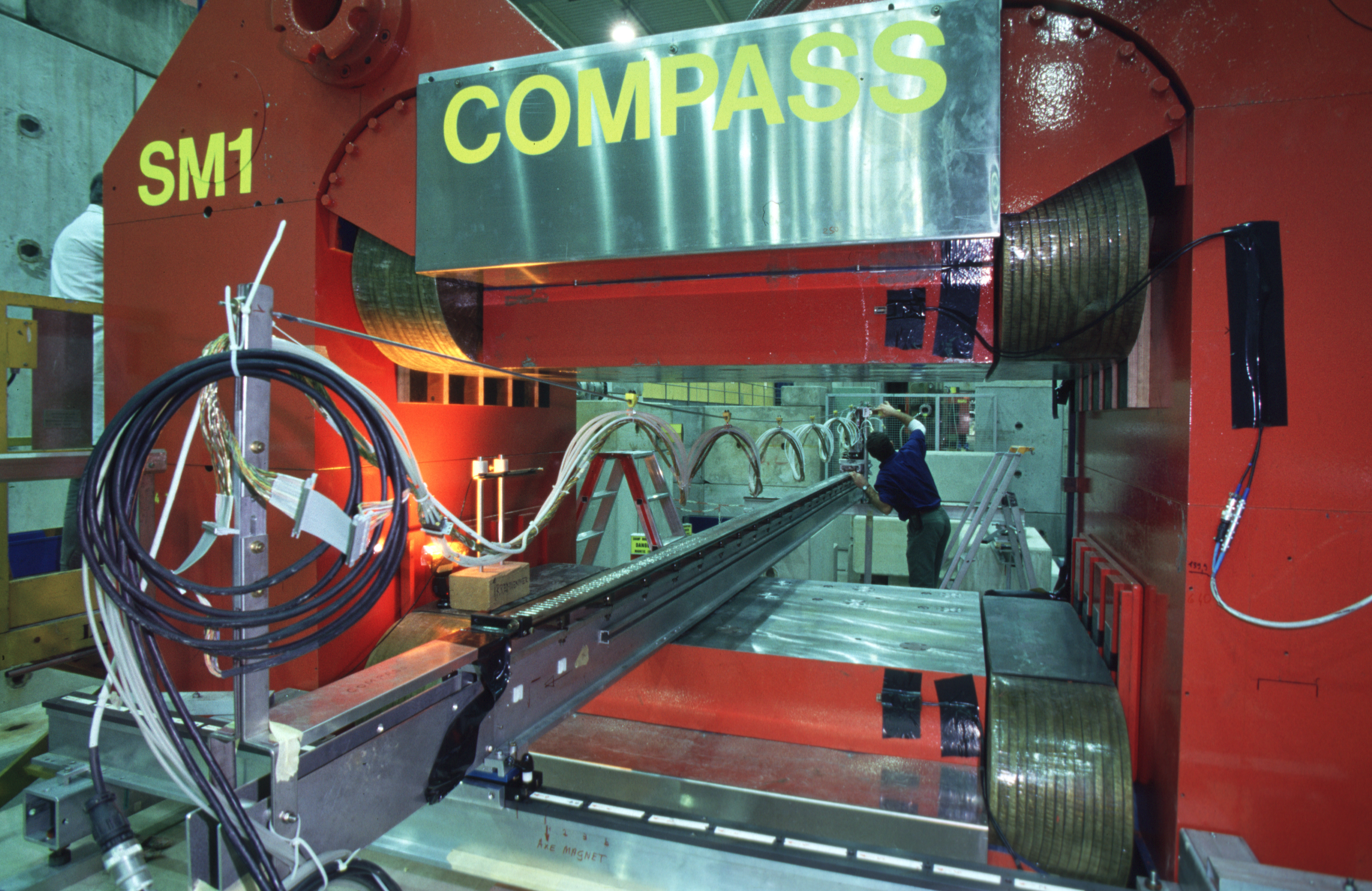
Construction of the COMPASS I experiment

COMPASS I (2002-2011)

- Nucleon spin structure
- Gluon polarisation in nucleons
- u,d,s flavour decomposition of the nucleon spin
- Transverse spin
- Quark transverse momentum distribution
- Pion polarisability
- Search for exotic states:
  - Light meson spectroscopy
  - Baryon spectroscopy

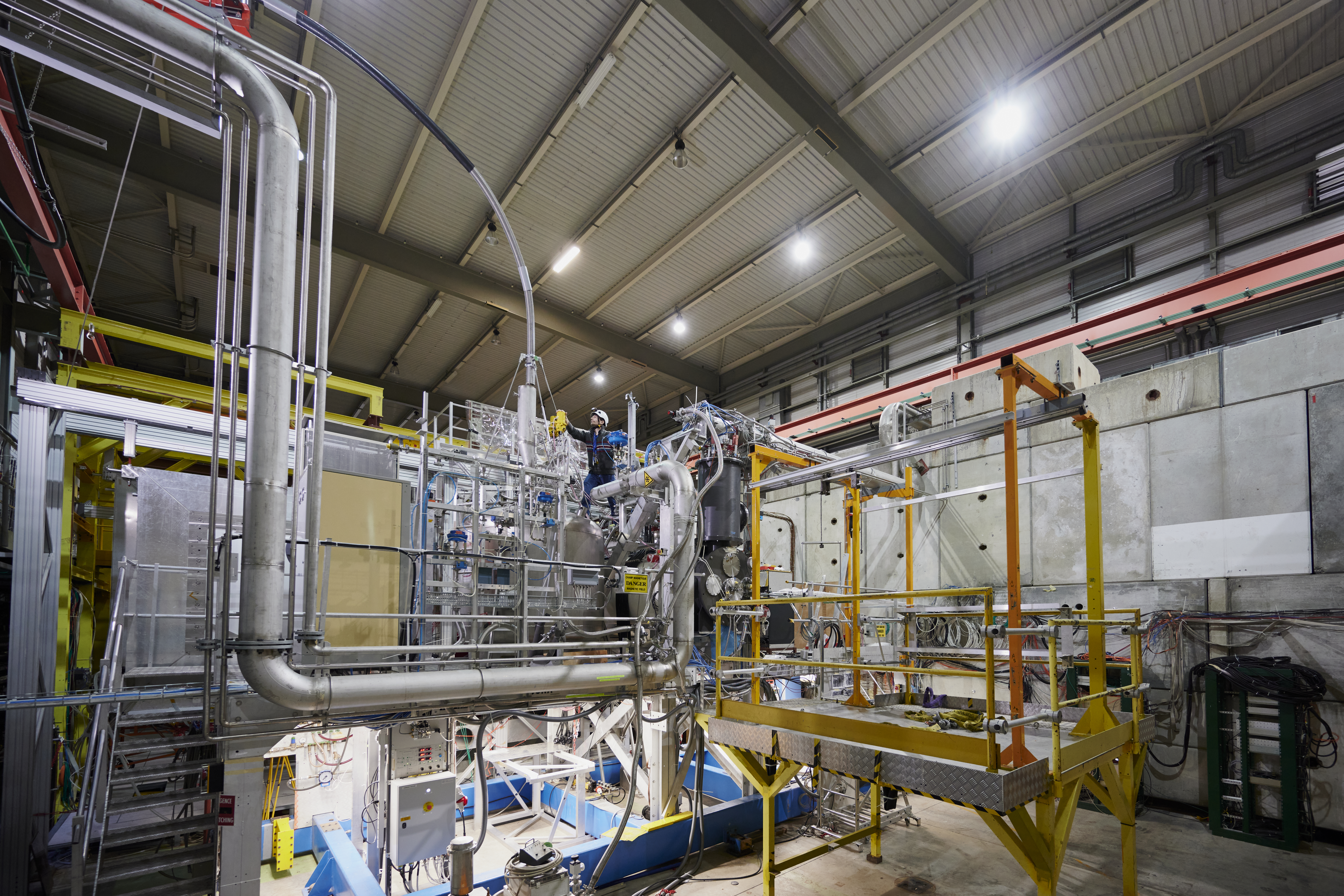
The COMPASS II experiment in the North Area

COMPASS II (2012-2021)

- Nucleon tomography (Deep Virtual Compton Scattering)
- Unpolarised quark transverse momentum distribution and strangeness
- Pion and kaon polarisabilities
- Polarised Drell-Yan: universality of transverse momentum distribution
- d-Quark Transversity

== Experimental Apparatus ==
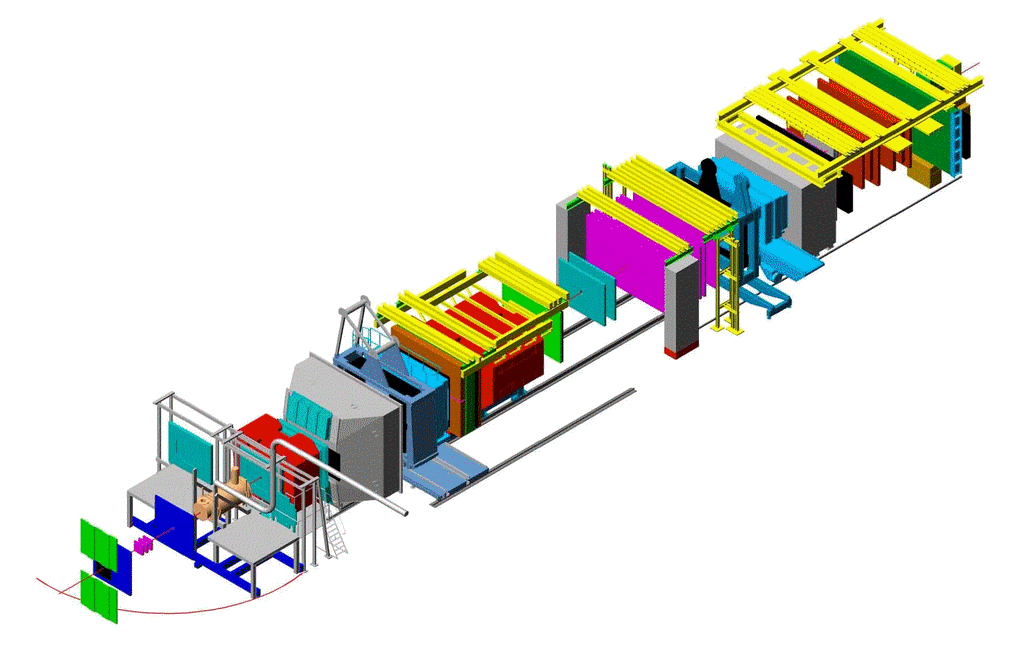
Artistic view of the COMPASS experiment

The experiment consists of three major parts: the beam telescope, the target area and the two-staged spectrometer.

=== Particle beam ===
The M2 beam line is able to transport various secondary and tertiary particle beams, which all originate from the Super Proton Synchrotron. The primary proton beam (400 GeV/c and up to 1.5E13 protons per super cycle) is steered on a beryllium production target producing secondary hadrons, mainly consisting of (anti-) protons, pions and kaons. The production target and the experiment are separated by a 1.1 km long transfer line, allowing through weak decay and use of massive hadron absorbers the production of a naturally spin-polarised muon beam. The beam line is designed to transport beams up to a momentum of 280 GeV/c. Usually, five different beams are used by COMPASS:

- positive and negative muon beams with a nominal momentum of 160 GeV/c or 200 GeV/c,
- positive hadron beams with a nominal momentum of 190 GeV/c and a composition of 75% protons, 24% pions and 1% kaons,
- negative hadron beams with a nominal momentum of 190 GeV/c and a composition of 1% anti-protons, 97% pions and 2% kaons,
- low intensity electron beam for calibration purposes (60 and 40 GeV/c).

=== Beam telescope ===
The timing and the position of the incident particles are determined with cold silicon strip detectors and scintillating fibre detectors. These informations are crucial to determine the interaction point inside the target material. Depending on the beam type, modifications in the beam telescope are done:

- For the muon beam, the momentum is measured using beam momentum stations,
- To distinguish between the different particle types in the hadron beam, a Cherenkov detector is used.

=== Target ===
According to the physics goal, a suitable target is needed. For polarised physics, the spins of the target material need to be oriented in one direction. The target cell contains either ammonium or deuterium, which are polarised by the means of microwave radiation and strong magnetic fields. To keep up the polarisation grade, a ^{3}He/^{4}He dilution refrigerator is used to cool down the target material to 50 mK. The target material can be polarised longitudinal or transverse to the beam axis.

For unpolarised physics, mostly liquid hydrogen is used, allowing to study the proton properties. For other physics, where high atomic numbers are needed, nickel, lead and other nuclear targets are used.

The main advantage of a fixed target experiment is the large acceptance. Due to the Lorentz boost, most of the final states and the scattered particles are created along the beam axis. This leads to the distinctive set-up of a fixed-target experiment: most detectors are placed behind the target ("forward spectrometer"). For some processes it is necessary to detect the recoil nucleon from the target. Here, a recoil proton detector consisting of two barrels of scintillator material is used. The protons are identified by the time of flight and the energy loss.

=== Spectrometer ===
The COMPASS experiment consists of two spectrometer stages with various tracking detector types, each set-up around a spectrometer magnet to determine the momentum of the particles. The first stage is dedicated to tracks with large scattering (production) angles and the second one for small angles. In addition, the first stage holds a Ring-Imaging CHerenkov detector ("RICH"), able to distinguish pions and kaons between 10 and 50 GeV. The following detector types for measuring charged particles are used:

- MicroMegas, micro mesh gas detector,
- Pixelised MicroMegas,
- GEMs, gaseous electron multiplier,
- Pixelised GEMs,
- Drift chambers,
- Straws ,
- SciFis, scintillating fibre stations,
- MWPC, multi wire proportional chambers,
- Hodoscopes, scintillator counter used for triggering on scattered muons.

Neutral particles, i.e. photons are detected with electro-magnetic calorimeters. The energy of produced hadrons are determined with hadronic calorimeters.

== See also ==
- List of Super Proton Synchrotron experiments
