= MicroMegas detector =

The MicroMegas detector (Micro-Mesh Gaseous Structure) is a gaseous particle detector and an advancement of the wire chamber. Invented in 1996 by Georges Charpak and Ioannis Giomataris, Micromegas detectors are mainly used in experimental physics, in particular in particle physics, nuclear physics and astrophysics for the detection of ionizing particles.

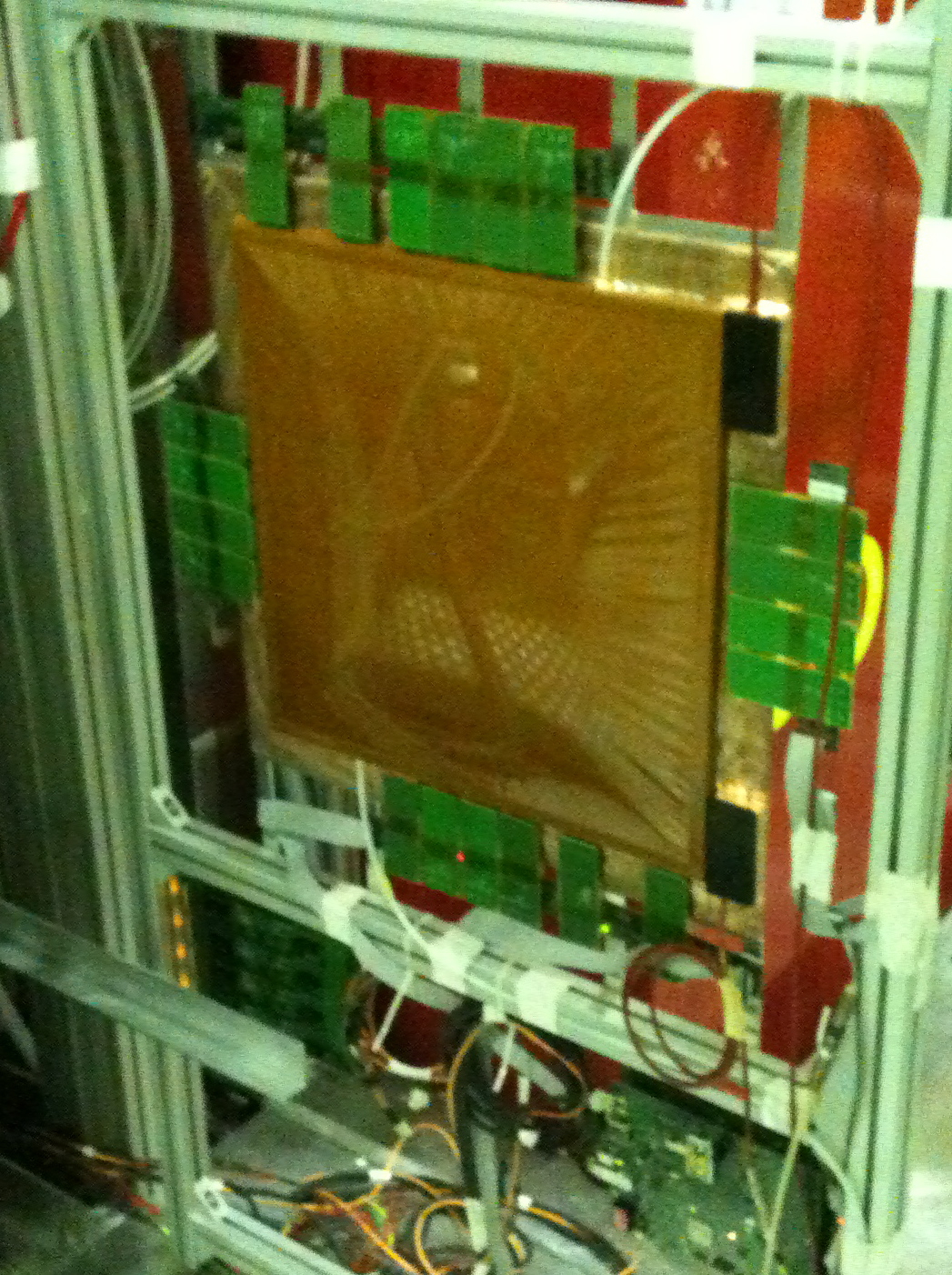
A Micromegas detector in function on the COMPASS spectrometer

Micromegas detectors are used to detect passing charged particles and obtain properties such as position, arrival time and momentum. The advantage of the Micromegas technology a high gain of 10^{4} while operating with small response times in the order of 100 ns. This is realized by dividing the gas chamber with a microscopic mesh, which makes the Micromegas detector a micropattern gaseous detector. In order to minimize the perturbation on the impinging particle, the detector is just a few millimeters thick.

== Working principle ==
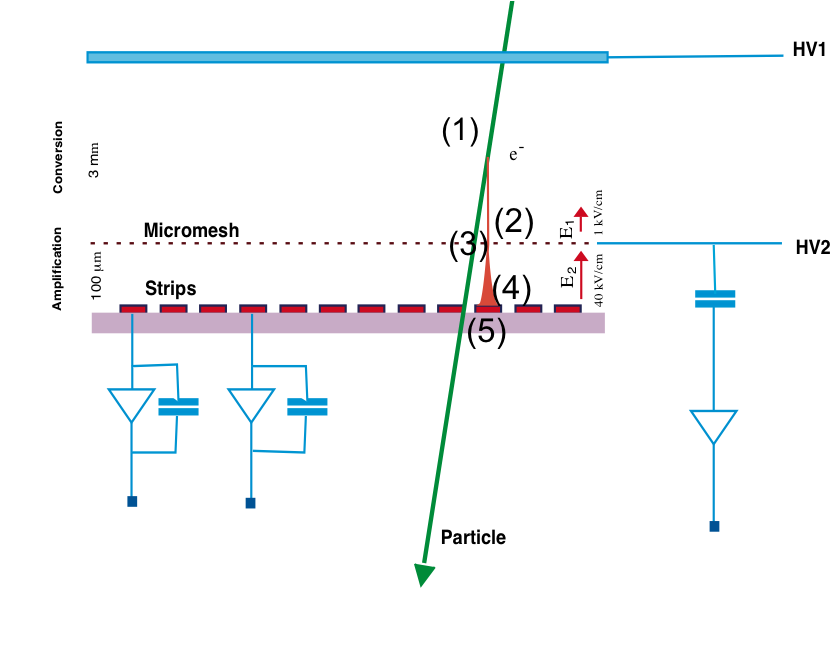
Working principle of a Micromegas detector. An electron/ion pair is created (1), and electron drifts (2) to the cathode. Close to a mesh (3) it undergoes an avalanche process (4), which is detected in the intended electrode (5).

=== Ionization and charge amplification ===
While passing through the detector, a particle ionizes the gas, resulting in an electron/ion pair. Due to an electric field in the order of 400 V/cm, the pair does not recombine, and the electron drifts toward the amplification electrode (the mesh) and the ion toward the cathode. Close to the mesh, the electron is accelerated by an intense electric field, typically in the order of 40 kV/cm in the amplification gap. This creates more electron/ion pairs, resulting in an electron avalanche. A gain on the order of 10^{4} creates a sufficiently large signal to be read out by the intended electrode. The readout electrode is usually segmented into strips and pixels in order to reconstruct the position of the impinging particle. The amplitude and the shape of the signal allows users to obtain information about the impinging time and energy of the impinging particle.

=== Analog signal of a Micromegas ===
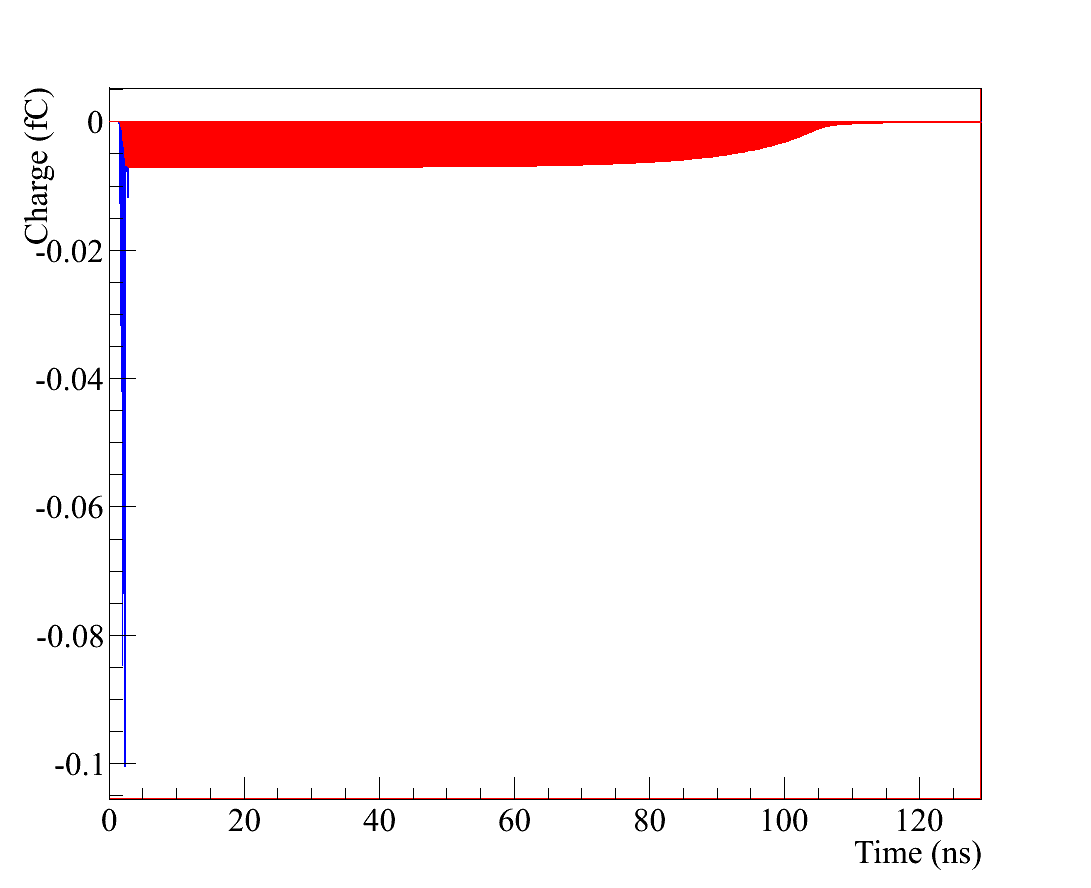
Signal induced on the readout electrode of a Micromegas detector (simulation). The blue curve shows the part of the signal induced by electrons and the red one by ions.

The signal is induced by the movement of charges in the volume between the micro-mesh and the readout electrode, called the amplification gap. The 100 ns long signal consists of an electron peak (blue) and an ion tail (red). Since the electron mobility in gas is over 1000 times higher than the ion mobility, its signal is registered much faster than the ionic signal. The electron signal allows to precisely measure the impinging time, while the ionic signal is necessary to reconstruct the energy of the particle.

== History ==
=== First concept at the Hadron Blind Detector ===
In 1991, to improve the detection of hadrons at the Hadron Blind Detector experiment, I. Giomataris and G. Charpak reduced the amplification gap of a parallel plate spark chamber in order to shorten the response time. A 1 mm amplification gap prototype was built for the HDB experiment but the gain was not uniform enough to be used in the experiment. The millimeter gap was not controlled enough and created large gain fluctuations. Nevertheless, the benefits of a reduce amplification gap had been demonstrated and the Micromegas concept was born in October 1992, shortly before the announcement of the Nobel Prize attribution to Georges Charpak for the invention of the wire chambers. Georges Charpak used to say that this detector and some other new concepts belonging to the family of micro-pattern gaseous detectors (MPGDs) would revolutionize nuclear and particle physics just as his detector had done.

=== The Micromegas technology research and development ===
Starting in 1992 at CEA Saclay and CERN, the Micromegas technology has been developed to provide more stable, reliable, precise and faster detectors. In 2001, twelve large Micromegas detectors of 40 x 40 cm^{2} were used for the first time in a large scale experiment at COMPASS situated on the Super Proton Synchrotron accelerator at CERN.

Another example of the development of the Micromegas detectors is the invention of the “bulk” technology. The “bulk” technology consists of the integration of the micro-mesh with the printed circuit board carrying the readout electrodes in order to build a monolithic detector. Such a detector is very robust and can be produced via an industrial process (a successful implementation was demonstrated by 3M in 2006) allowing public applications. For instance, by modifying the micro-mesh in order to make it photo-sensitive to UV light, Micromegas detectors can be used to detect forest fires. A photo-sensitive Micromegas is also used for fast-timing applications. The PICOSEC-Micromegas uses a Cherenkov radiator and a photocathode in front of the gaseous volume and a time resolution of 24 ps is measured with minimum ionizing particles.

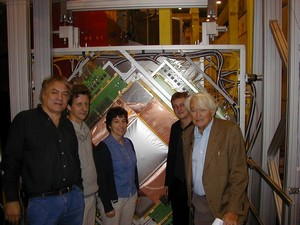
One of the first experiments with Micromegas detectors: COMPASS. On this 2001 pictures, we see Georges Charpak and the COMPASS Saclay team in front of the large Micromegas chambers.

=== Micromegas detectors in experimental physics ===
Micromegas detectors are used in several experiments :

- Hadronic physics: COMPASS, NA48, and projects for the ILC-TPC and CLAS12 at J-lab are under active study
- Particle physics: T2K, CAST, HELAZ, IAXO
- Neutron physics: nTOF, ESS nBLM

Micromegas detector will be used in the ATLAS experiment, as part of the upgrade of its planned muon spectrometer.

== See also ==
- Gaseous ionization detector
- Micropattern gaseous detector
- Gas electron multiplier
