= NA32 experiment =

Research project at CERN

Super Proton Synchrotron (SPS)

Key SPS Experiments
- UA1: Underground Area 1
- UA2: Underground Area 2
- NA31: NA31 Experiment
- NA32: Investigation of Charm Production in Hadronic Interactions Using High-Resolution Silicon Detectors
- COMPASS: Common Muon and Proton Apparatus for Structure and Spectroscopy
- SHINE: SPS Heavy Ion and Neutrino Experiment
- NA62: NA62 Experiment

SPS preaccelerators
- p and Pb: Linear accelerators for protons (Linac 2) and Lead (Linac 3)
- (not marked): Proton Synchrotron Booster
- PS: Proton Synchrotron

NA32, "Investigation of Charm Production in Hadronic Interactions Using High - Resolution Silicon Detectors", was a research project at CERN. The project was approved on 18 November 1982, data taking completed on 20 August 1986 and the analysis of the results was formally considered finished on 20 August 1996.

It was also known as ACCMOR, an acronym of the names of the collaborating research institutes which carried it out — the Amsterdam-Bristol-CERN-Cracow-Munich-Rutherford Collaboration, which was also responsible for the WA3 experiment.

The experiment was designed to measure precisely the momentum of charged particles emerging from high energy hadron interactions and identify these particles over a large range of momenta. Experimental setup consists of two large spectrometer magnets, forty-eight planes of drift chambers arranged in several arms and four multicell threshold Cerenkov counters. A calorimeter at the end was used to measure the position and energy of photons and electrons.

The target region consisted of a telescope of seven silicon microstrip detectors to measure the incoming beam, a forward vertex detector to precisely track secondary particles produced in high energy hadronic interactions and a 2.5 mm thick copper target.

Microstrip detectors used in the NA32 experiment come from three different sources. Most were produced by J.Kemmer at the Technical University of Munich following a technique developed earlier by Kemmer. In an early stage of the experiment (1982), four detectors in the beam telescope produced by ENERTEC in Strasbourg were used. In 1984 and 1985 two prototype detectors produced by MICRON in England were included for specific tests.

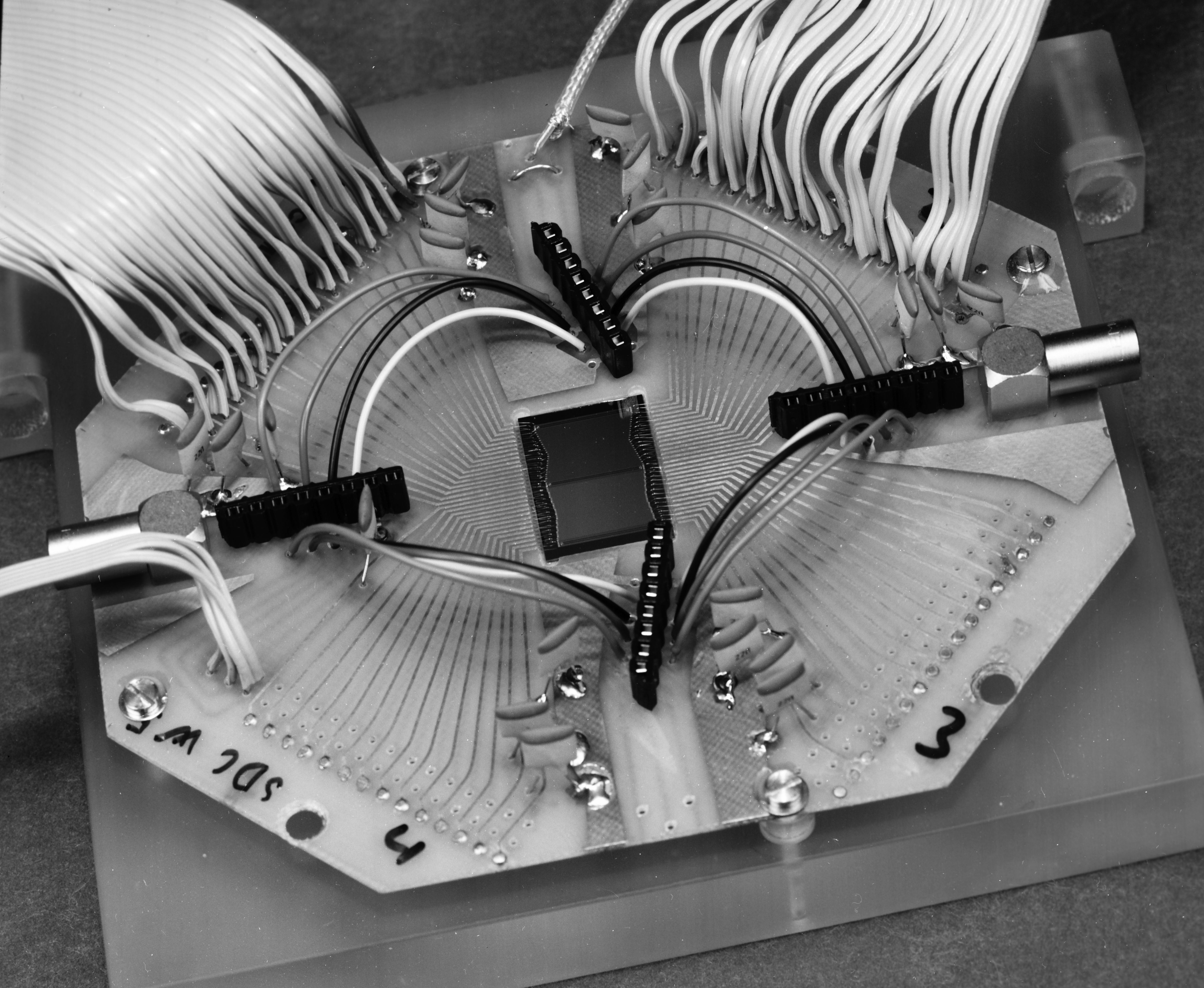
Silicon drift chamber used in the NA32 experiment at CERN

The pixel size of the NA32 detectors was 22 × 22 μm, and the effective detector thickness ~15 μm. The relatively shallow active area lead to a very small signal demanding cooling and very low noise electronics. In the NA32 the data was read out at a rate of 1.5-3 MHz, allowing ~50 000 pixels to be read out in 16 ms.

NA32 proved that tracking using silicon microstrip detectors was a practical technique for resolving particle tracks over very short distances, and in particular for detecting short-lived particles down to half lives of fractions of picoseconds.

== See also ==
- List of Super Proton Synchrotron experiments
