= NA62 experiment =

Particle physics experiment

Super Proton Synchrotron (SPS)

Key SPS Experiments
- UA1: Underground Area 1
- UA2: Underground Area 2
- NA31: NA31 Experiment
- NA32: Investigation of Charm Production in Hadronic Interactions Using High-Resolution Silicon Detectors
- COMPASS: Common Muon and Proton Apparatus for Structure and Spectroscopy
- SHINE: SPS Heavy Ion and Neutrino Experiment
- NA62: NA62 Experiment

SPS preaccelerators
- p and Pb: Linear accelerators for protons (Linac 2) and Lead (Linac 3)
- (not marked): Proton Synchrotron Booster
- PS: Proton Synchrotron

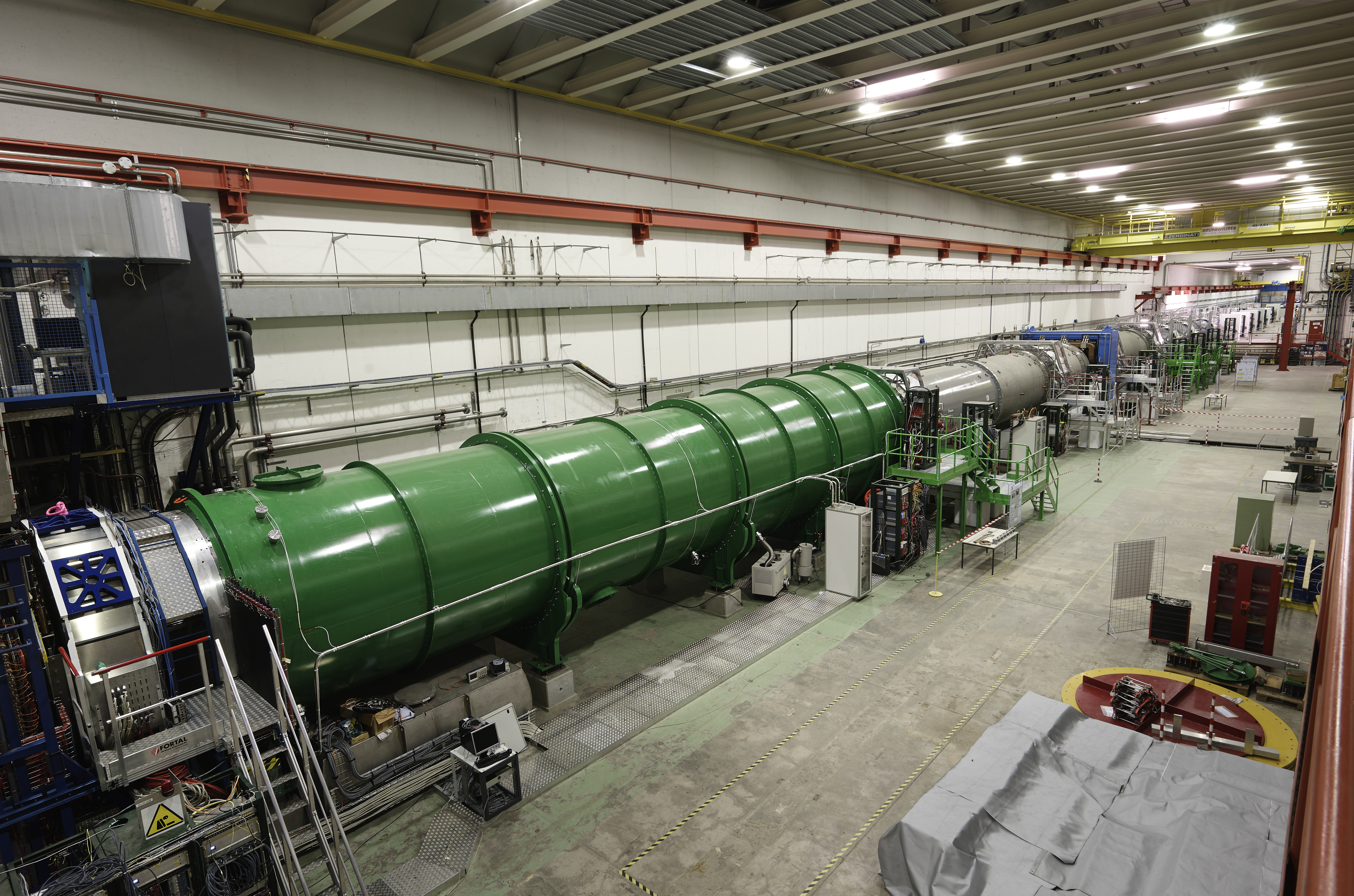
NA62 experiment hall

The NA62 experiment (known as P-326 at the stage of the proposal) is a fixed-target particle physics experiment in the North Area of the SPS accelerator at CERN. The experiment was approved in February 2007. Data taking began in 2015, and the experiment is expected to become the first in the world to probe the decays of the charged kaon with probabilities down to 10^{−12}. The experiment's spokesperson is Giuseppe Ruggiero (since October 2022; the former spokespersons were Cristina Lazzeroni 2019–2022 and Augusto Ceccucci before 2019). The collaboration involves 308 participants from 33 institutions and 16 countries around the world.

== Goals ==
The experiment is designed to conduct precision tests of the Standard Model by studying rare decays of charged kaons. The principal goal, for which the design has been optimized, is the measurement of the rate of the ultra-rare decay K^{+} → π^{+} + ν + ν̅ with a precision of 10%, by detecting about 100 decay candidates with low background. This will lead to the determination of the CKM matrix element |V_{td}| with a precision better than 10%. This element relates very accurately to the likelihood that top quarks decay to down quarks. The Particle Data Group's 2008 Review of Particle Physics lists |V_{td}| = 0.00874+0.00026
−0.00037. A broad program of studies of kaon physics is run in parallel including studies of other rare decays, searches for forbidden decays, and for new exotic particles not predicted by the standard model (for example Dark Photons).

== Experimental Apparatus ==
In order to achieve the desired precision, the NA62 experiment requires a certain level of signal sensitivity and background rejection. Namely, high-resolution timing (to support a high-rate environment), kinematic rejection (involving the cutting on the square of the missing mass of the observed charged particle from the decay with respect to the incident kaon vector), particle identification (especially distinguishing between pions and muons), hermetic vetoing of photons out to large angles, and redundancy of information.

Due to these necessities, the NA62 experiment has constructed a detector which is approximately 270 m in length. The components of the experiment are explained briefly below, for full details see.

=== Beam Line ===
The foundation of the NA62 experiment is observing the decays of kaons. A primary beam of protons from the SPS is delivered to a target at which a secondary hadron beam is produced which contains the kaons.

The Primary Beam, called P42, is used for the production of the $K^{+}$ beam. The 400 GeV/c SPS proton beam is split into three branches and strikes three targets (T2, T4, and T6). This produces beams of secondary particles which are directed through the underground target tunnel (TCC2). At the exit of T4, the beam of transmitted protons passes through apertures in two vertically-motorized beam-dump/collimator modules, TAX 1 and TAX 2 for P42, in which holes of different apertures define the angular acceptance of the beam and hence allow the flux of protons to be selected over a wide range. In order to protect the components of the apparatus, a computer surveillance program allows the currents in the principle magnets along the P42 beam line to be monitored and to close TAX2 in case of error.

A secondary beam line, K12HIKA+, is the kaon beam line. The target/beam tunnel, TCC8, and the cavern, ECN3, where the detectors of the NA62 experiment have been installed, have a combined length of 270m. The T10 target (located 15m from the beginning of TCC8) is used to produce the final secondary hadron beam (K12). This K12 beam-line has a length of 102m, ending at the exit of the final collimator which marks the beginning of the decay fiducial region and points to the NA62 detectors (notably the liquid krypton electro-magnetic calorimeter, LKr).

The K12 beam has an instantaneous rate of about 600 MHz and is composed primarily of pions (70%) and protons (23%) with only 6% being kaons. Approximately 10% of the kaons decay in the fiducial decay volume, corresponding to a rate of 4 MHz of kaon decays in the fiducial region.

=== Cedar/KTAG ===
The KTAG is the 'kaon tagger', designed to identify $K^{+}$ particles within the unseparated hadron beam. This detector is a differential Cherenkov counter (CERN west-area Cedar until 2022, replaced by a new Cedar-H in 2023), instrumented with a bespoke detector consisting of 8 arrays of photodetectors (KTAG).

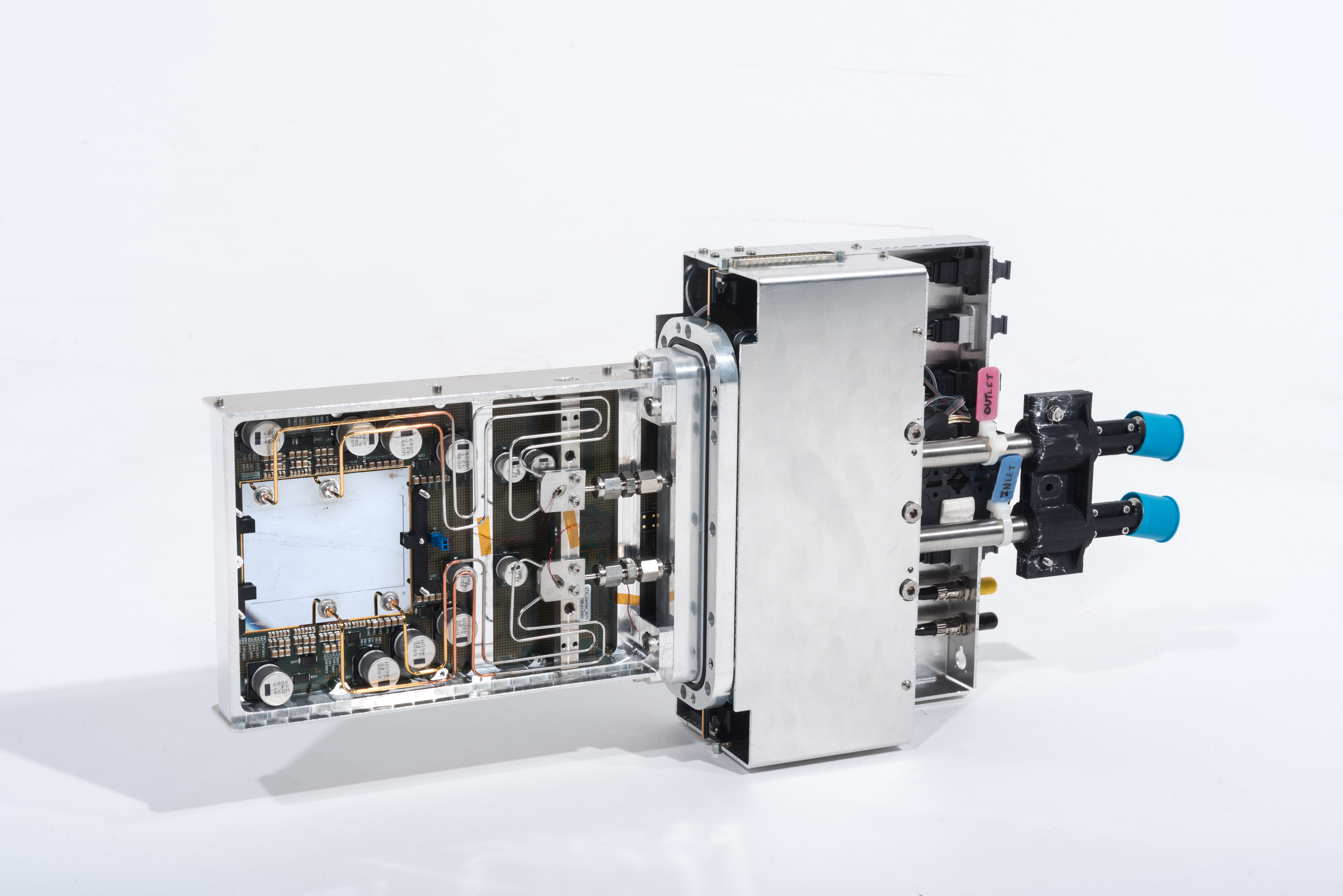
GTK for the NA62 experiment

=== GigaTracker (GTK) ===
Placed immediately upstream of the fiducial decay region, the GTK is designed to measure the time, direction, and momentum of all the beam tracks. The GTK is a spectrometer and provides the measurements of the incoming 75 GeV/c kaon beam. The GTK measurements are used for decay selections and background reduction.

The GTK is composed of four hybrid silicon pixel tracker stations labeled GTK0 (installed in 2021) GTK1, GTK2, and GTK3 based on the order in which they are found relative to the beam path. They are mounted around four achromat magnets (which are used to deflect the beam). The entire system is placed along the beam line and is inside the vacuum tank.

=== CHANTI ===
This charged anti-counter detector (CHANTI) is primarily designed to veto events with inelastic interactions between beam particles and the GTK3. The detector is constructed from six planes of scintillator detectors surrounding the beam.

=== Straw Tracker ===
The kaon beam passes through the upstream region and into the decay region, a roughly 60 m long region inside a large vacuum vessel, after which the decay products are detected in the straw tracker stations. The system measures the direction and the momentum of secondary charged particles which come from the decay region. This spectrometer is made with four chambers intersected with a high aperture dipole magnet. Each of the chambers consists of multiple straw tubes positioned to offer four views to give four coordinates. Out of 7168 straws in the whole system, only one was flawed. The leaking straw was sealed and the detector operated normally during the 2015 run.

=== Photon Veto Systems ===
The experiment has a photon veto system that provides hermetic coverage between 0 and 50 milliradians. This system is made up of several subsystems covering different angular ranges; the Large Angle Vetos (LAVs) cover 8.5 - 50 mrad, the Liquid Krypton Calorimeter (LKr) covering 1 - 8.5 mrad and the Small Angle Vetos (SAV) covering 0 - 1 mrad.

==== Large Angle Vetos (LAV) ====
The 12 LAV stations are constructed from four or five annular rings of lead glass scintillator detectors surrounding the decay volume. The first 11 stations are operated in the same vacuum tank as the decay volume and STRAW while the final chamber (LAV12) is positioned after the RICH and operated in air.

==== Small Angle Vetos (SAV), Intermediate Ring Calorimeter (IRC) and Small Angle Calorimeter (SAC) ====
The IRC and SAC are electromagnetic sampling calorimeters constructed from alternating layers of lead and plastic scintillators. The SAC is positioned at the very end of the experimental apparatus in line with the beam path but after the charged particles are bent away and sent into the beam dump. This means any photons traveling along the beam direction down to 0 angle can be detected.

=== Liquid Krypton Calorimeter (LKr) ===
The LKr detector is re-used from NA48 with upgraded readout systems. The active material of the calorimeter is liquid krypton. Electromagnetic showers, initiated by charged particles or photons, are detected via ionisation electrons which drift to anodes positioned inside the liquid krypton. The signals are amplified and distributed to the readout systems.

=== Ring Imaging Cherenkov Detector (RICH) ===
The RICH is designed to distinguish between pions and muons for particles of momentum between 15 and 35 GeV/c. It is constructed from a 17.5 m long vessel with diameter up to 4.2 m and filled with nitrogen gas (at about 990 mbar). As charged particles pass through the gas Cherenkov photons are emitted at a fixed angle determined by the momentum and mass of the particle and the pressure of the nitrogen gas. Photons are reflected from an array of mirrors at the downstream end of the RICH and detected in two arrays of photomultiplier tube detectors at the upstream end of the vessel.

=== Charged Hodoscopes (NA48-CHOD & CHOD) ===
The CHOD detectors are scintillator detectors which provide input to the trigger system detecting charged particles. The system is formed from the NA48-CHOD detector, re-used from the NA48 experiment and formed from 2 planes of scintillating bars arranged vertically and horizontally, and the newly constructed CHOD constructed from an array of scintillator tiles read out by Silicon photomultipliers.

=== Hadronic Calorimeters (MUV1 & MUV2) ===
The MUV1 and MUV2 are sampling hadronic calorimeters formed from alternating layers of iron and scintillators. The newly constructed MUV1 has fine transverse segmentation to separate electromagnetic and hadronic components of showers and the MUV2 is re-used from NA48.

=== Muon Veto Detector (MUV3) ===
The MUV3 is constructed from a plane of scintillator tiles, reach read out by a pair of photomultipliers, and positioned behind an 80 cm iron wall which blocks particles leaving only muons to be detected. This detector provides a fast muon veto at trigger level and is used to identify muons at analysis level.

== Data ==
The experiment has run multiple tests to ensure that the new detector components were working properly. The first physics run with a nearly complete detector took place in 2015. NA62 collected data in 2016, 2017 and 2018 before the CERN Long Shut Down 2. Data-taking resumed in 2021 and will continue until CERN Long Shut Down 3.

As part of the experiment, several papers have been, and are in the process of being published. A list of published papers for the NA62 experiment can be found here.

== Results ==
=== $K^{+}\rightarrow\pi^{+}\nu\overline{\nu}$ ===
==== 2016 Data ====
Results published: .

==== 2017 Data ====
Results first presented at KAON19 conference.

=== Forbidden $K^{+}$ Decays ===
==== $K^{+}\rightarrow\pi^{-}\ell^{+}\ell^{+}$ (Lepton Number Violation) ====
Results published:

=== Exotics ===
==== Heavy Neutral Lepton ====
Results published:

==== Dark Photon ====
Results published:

== See also ==
- NA48 experiment
- CERN NA62 Home
- NA62 Website
- NA62 and NA48 published papers
