= Fixed-target experiment =

Diagram of the Rutherford gold foil experiment.

A fixed-target experiment in particle physics is an experiment in which a beam of accelerated particles is collided with a stationary target. The moving beam (also known as a projectile) consists of charged particles such as electrons or protons and is accelerated to relativistic speed. The fixed target can be a solid block or a liquid or a gaseous medium. These experiments are distinct from the collider-type experiments in which two moving particle beams are accelerated and collided. The famous Rutherford gold foil experiment, performed between 1908 and 1913, was one of the first fixed-target experiments, in which the alpha particles were targeted at a thin gold foil.

== Explanation ==
The energy involved in a fixed target experiment is 4 times smaller compared to that in collider with the dual beams of same energy. More over in collider experiments energy of two beams is available to produce new particles, while in fixed target case a lot of energy is just expended in giving velocities to the newly created particles. This clearly implies that fixed target experiments are not helpful when it comes to increasing the energy scales of experiments. The targeted source also wears down with number of strikes and usually require a regular replacement. Current day fixed-target experiments try to use highly resistant materials but the damage cannot be avoided entirely.

The fixed target experiments have a significant advantage for experiments that require higher luminosity (rate of interaction). The High Luminosity Large Hadron Collider, which is an upcoming upgraded version of the Large Hadron Collider (LHC) at CERN, will attain total integrated luminosity of around $\mathrm{5 \times 10^{35} cm^{-2} s^{-1}}$ in its run. While luminosity scale of about $\mathrm{5 \times 10^{34} cm^{-2} s^{-1}}$ have already been approached by older fixed target experiments such at the E288 led by Leon Lederman at Fermilab. Another advantage for fixed-target experiments is that they are easier and cheaper to build compared to the collider accelerators.

== Experimental facilities ==
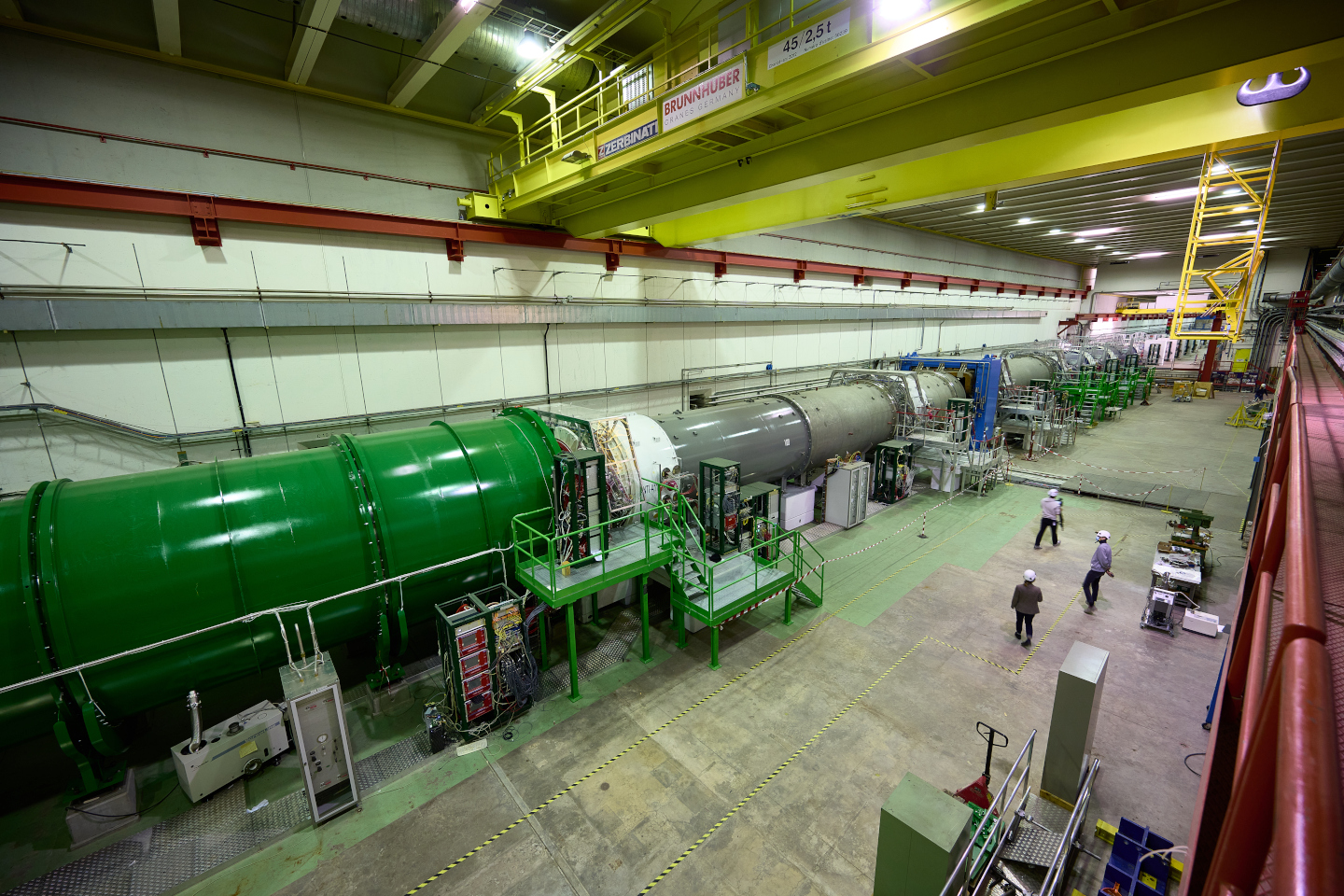
NA62 experimental area at CERN that fires high-energy protons from the Super Proton Synchrotron (SPS) into a stationary beryllium target.

Rutherford's gold foil experiment that led to the discovery that mass and positive charge of an atom was concentrated in a small nucleus was probably the first fixed-target experiment. Later half of the 20th century saw the rise of particle and nuclear physics facilities such as CERN's Super Proton Synchrotron (SPS) and Fermilab's Tevatron where number of fixed-target experiments led to new discoveries. 43 fixed-target experiments were conducted at the Tevatron during its run period from 1983 to 2000. While proton and other beams from SPS are still used by fixed target experiments such as NA61/SHINE and COMPASS collaboration. A fixed-target facility at the LHC, called AFTER@LHC, is also being planned.

== Physics at fixed-target experiments ==
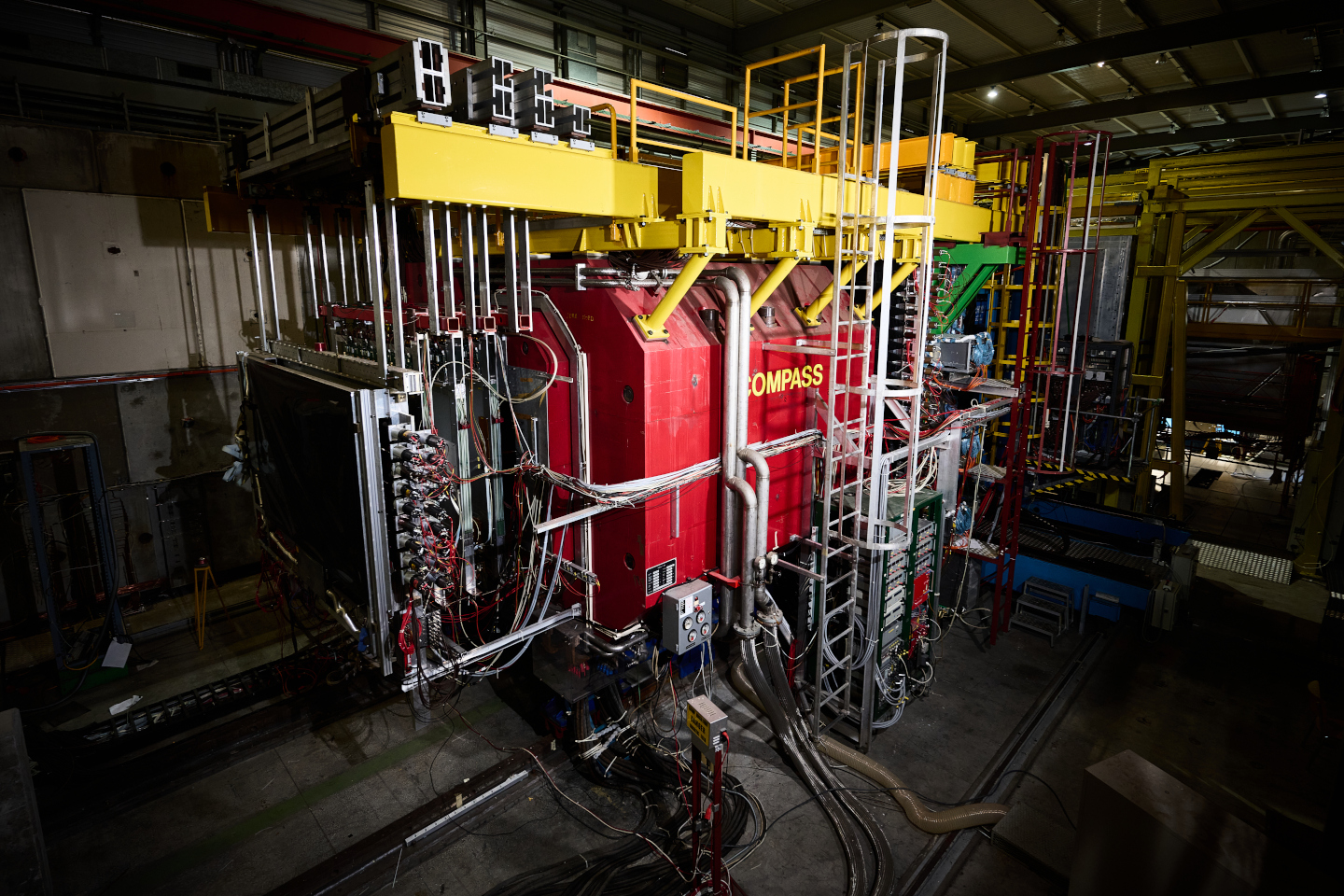
COMPASS experimental area at CERN that fires muons and pions at a polarized target.

The fixed-target experiments are mainly implemented for the intensive studies of the rare processes, dynamics at high Bjorken x, diffractive physics, spin-correlations, and numerous nuclear phenomena.

The experiments at Fermilab's Tevatron facility covered wide range of physics domains such as testing the theoretical predictions of quantum chromodynamics theory, studies of structure of proton, neutron and mesons, and studies of heavy quarks such as charm and bottom. Several experiments looked into CP symmetry tests. Few collaborations also studied the hyperons and the neutrinos created at fixed-target setups.

NA61/SHINE at the SPS is studying the phase transitions in strongly interacting matter and physics related to onset of confinement. While the COMPASS experiment investigates the structure of the hadrons.

AFTER@LHC aims at the studies of gluon and quark distribution inside protons and neutrons using fixed-target facilities. There are possibilities to observe the W and Z bosons as well. Observation and studies of the Drell-Yan pair production and quarkonium are also being looked into.

Thus the number of options available to explore extreme and rare physics at the fixed-target experiments are numerous.

== See also ==
- Collider
- List of fixed-target experiments
