= Gaseous ionization detector =

Radiation detector

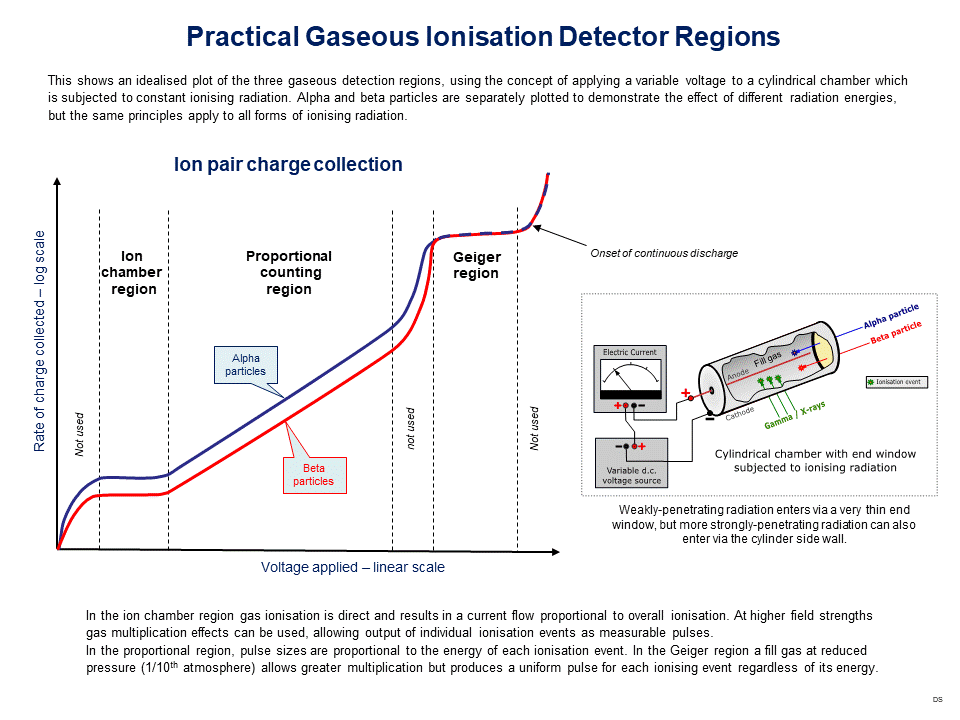
Plot of variation of ion pair current against applied voltage for a wire cylinder gaseous radiation detector.

Gaseous ionization detectors are radiation detection instruments used in particle physics to detect the presence of ionizing particles, and in radiation protection applications to measure ionizing radiation.

They use the ionising effect of radiation upon a gas-filled sensor. If a particle has enough energy to ionize a gas atom or molecule, the resulting electrons and ions cause a current flow which can be measured.

Gaseous ionisation detectors form an important group of instruments used for radiation detection and measurement. This article gives a quick overview of the principal types, and more detailed information can be found in the articles on each instrument. The accompanying plot shows the variation of ion pair generation with varying applied voltage for constant incident radiation. There are three main practical operating regions, one of which each type utilises.

== Types ==
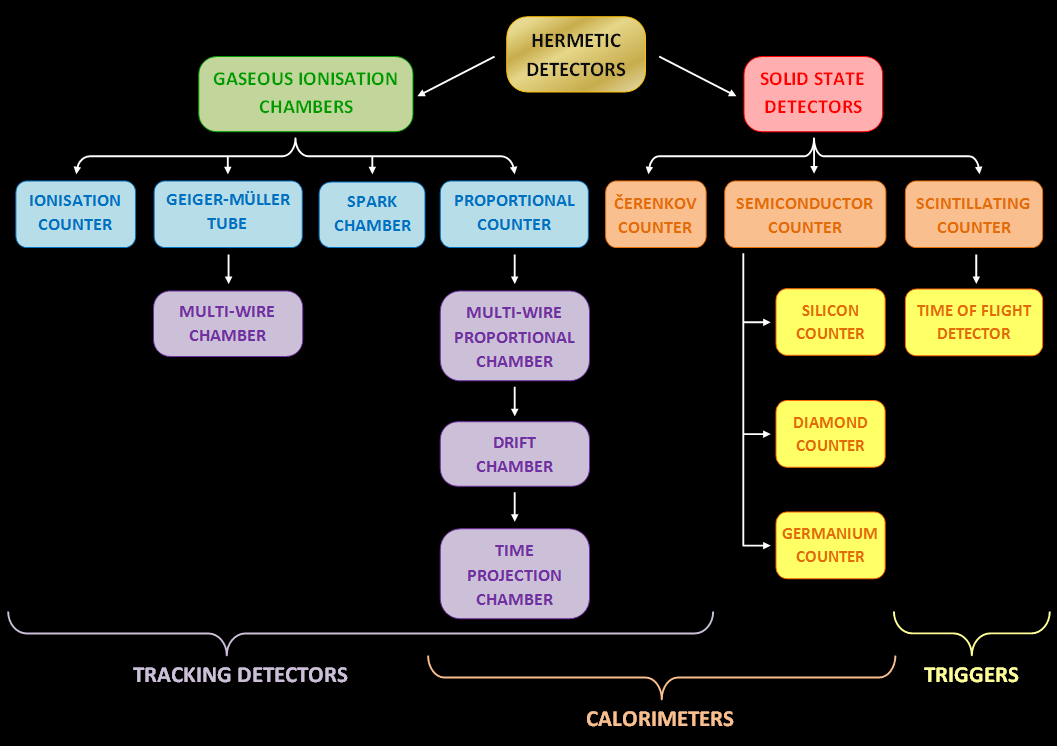
Families of ionising radiation detectors

The three basic types of gaseous ionization detectors are 1) ionization chambers, 2) proportional counters, and 3) Geiger–Müller tubes

All of these have the same basic design of two electrodes separated by air or a special fill gas, but each uses a different method to measure the total number of ion-pairs that are collected. The strength of the electric field between the electrodes and the type and pressure of the fill gas determines the detector's response to ionizing radiation.

=== Ionization chamber ===
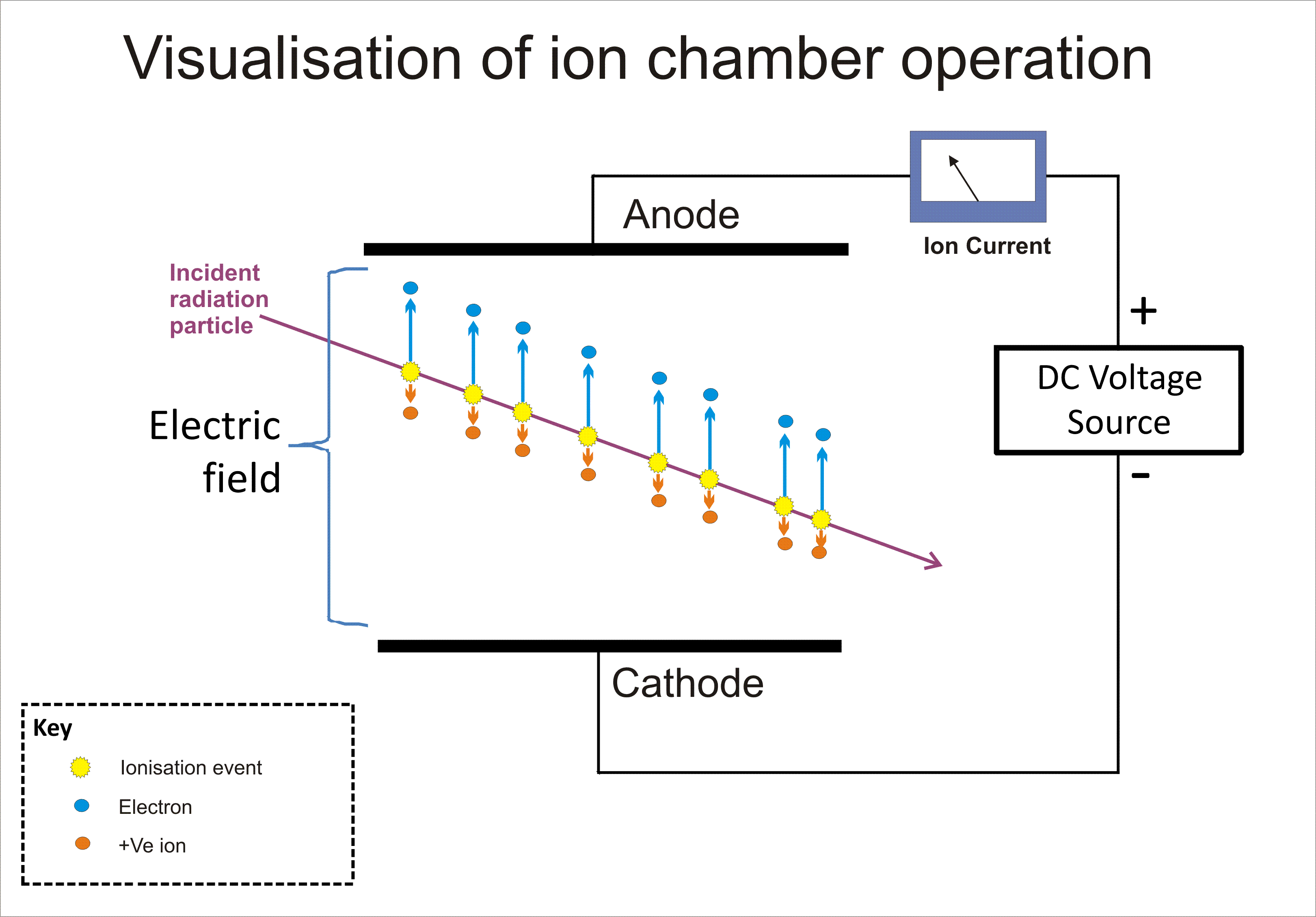
Schematic diagram of ion chamber, showing drift of ions. Electrons typically drift 1000 times faster than positive ions due to their much smaller mass.

Ionization chambers operate at a low electric field strength, selected such that no gas multiplication takes place. The ion current is generated by the creation of "ion pairs", consisting of an ion and an electron. The ions drift to the cathode while free electrons drift to the anode under the influence of the electric field. This current is independent of the applied voltage if the device is being operated in the "ion chamber region". Ion chambers are preferred for high radiation dose rates because they have no "dead time"; a phenomenon which affects the accuracy of the Geiger–Müller tube at high dose rates.

The advantages are good uniform response to gamma radiation and accurate overall dose reading, capable of measuring very high radiation rates, sustained high radiation levels do not degrade the fill gas.

The disadvantages are 1) low output requiring sophisticated electrometer circuit and 2) operation and accuracy easily affected by moisture.

=== Proportional counter ===
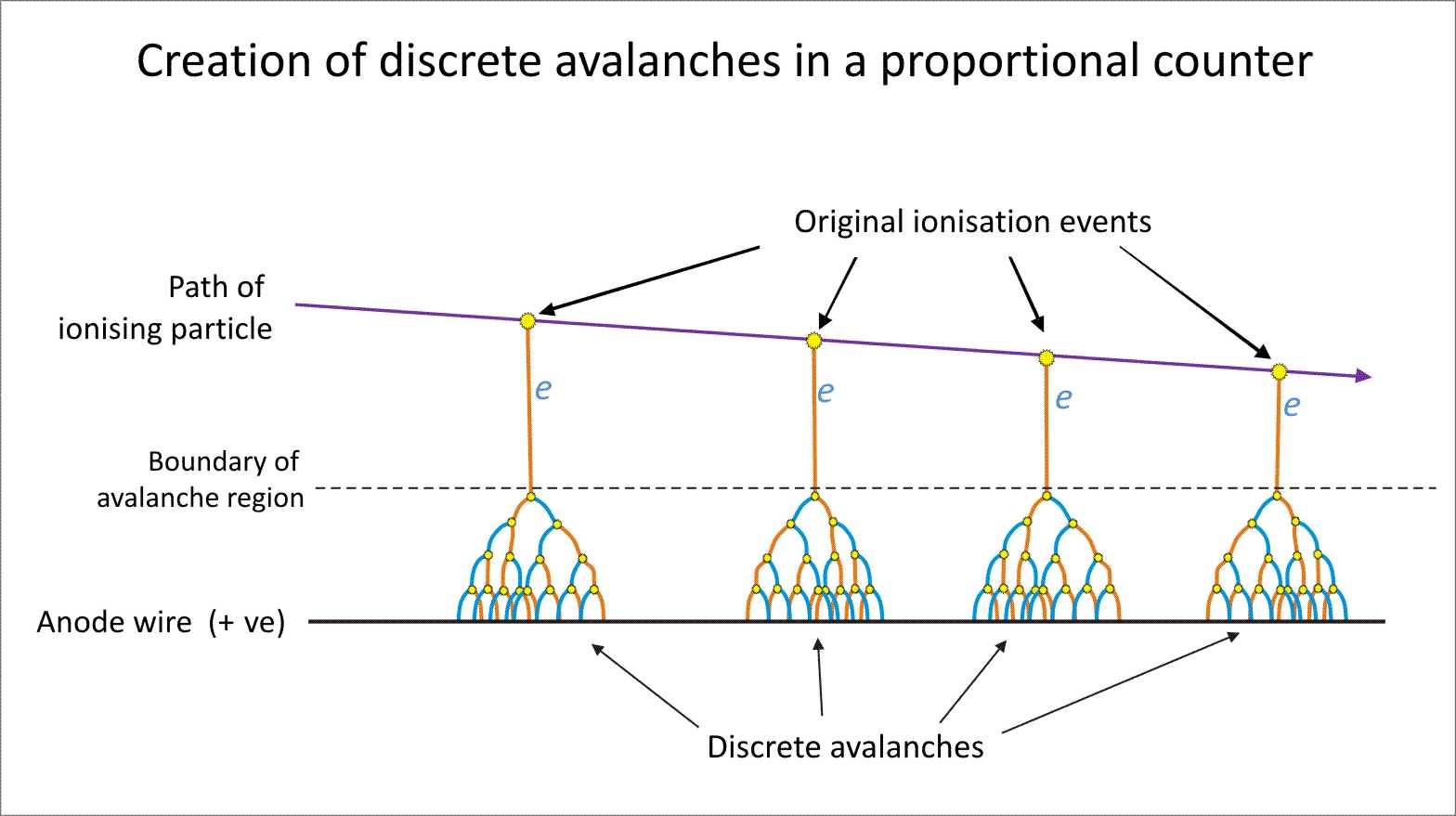
The generation of discrete Townsend avalanches in a proportional counter.

Proportional counters operate at a slightly higher voltage, selected such that discrete avalanches are generated. Each ion pair produces a single avalanche so that an output current pulse is generated which is proportional to the energy deposited by the radiation. This is in the "proportional counting" region. The term "gas proportional detector" (GPD) is generally used in radiometric practice, and the property of being able to detect particle energy is particularly useful when using large area flat arrays for alpha and beta particle detection and discrimination, such as in installed personnel monitoring equipment.

The wire chamber is a multi-electrode form of proportional counter used as a research tool.

The advantages are the ability to measure energy of radiation and provide spectrographic information, discriminate between alpha and beta particles, and that large area detectors can be constructed.

The disadvantages are that anode wires are delicate and can lose efficiency in gas flow detectors due to deposition, the efficiency and operation affected by ingress of oxygen into fill gas, and measurement windows easily damaged in large area detectors.

Micropattern gaseous detectors (MPGDs) are high granularity gaseous detectors with sub-millimeter distances between the anode and cathode electrodes. The main advantages of these microelectronic structures over traditional wire chambers include: count rate capability, time and position resolution, granularity, stability and radiation hardness. Examples of MPGDs are the microstrip gas chamber, the gas electron multiplier and the micromegas detector.

=== Geiger–Müller tube ===
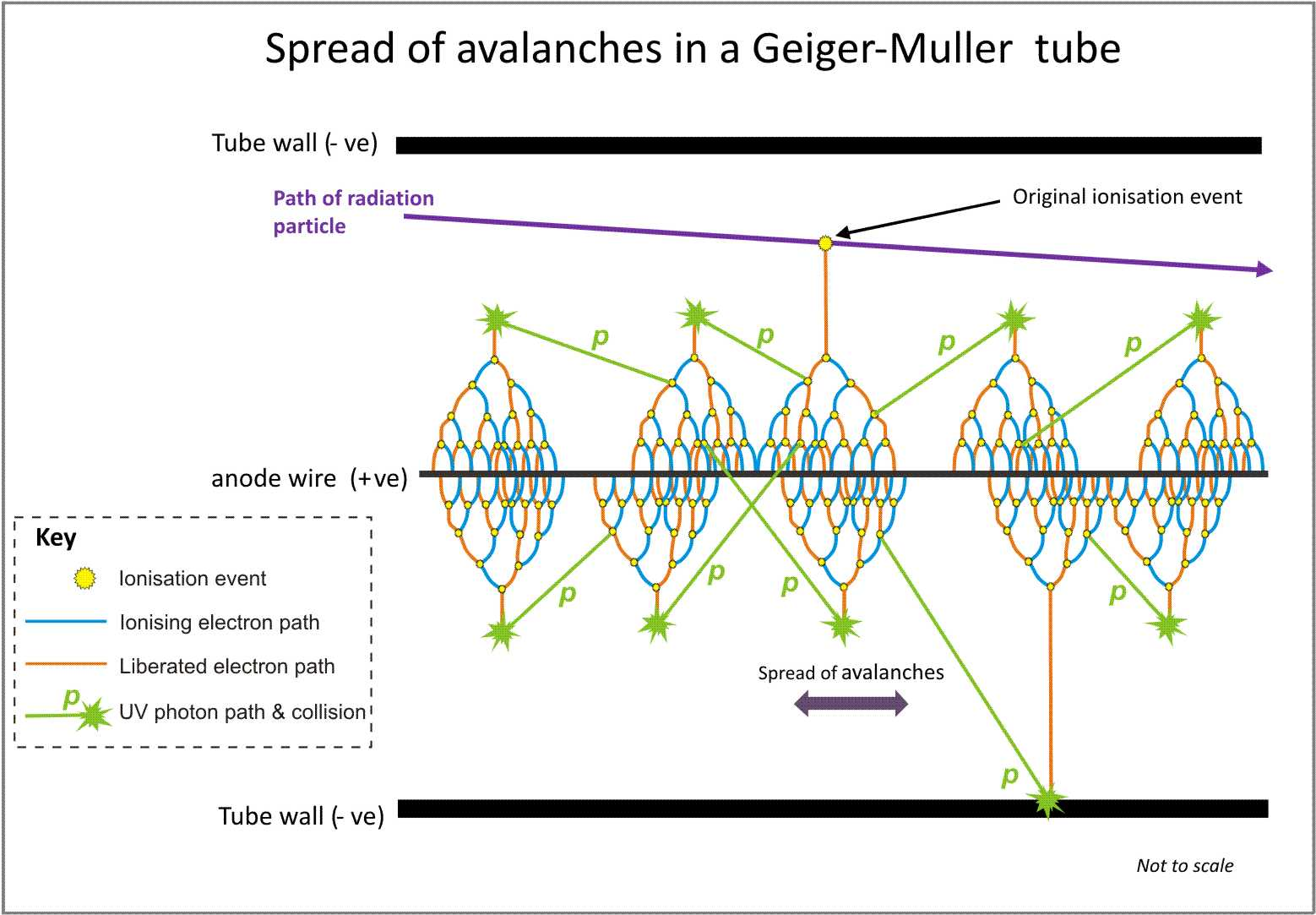
Visualisation of the spread of Townsend avalanches by means of UV photons

Geiger–Müller tubes are the primary components of Geiger counters. They operate at an even higher voltage, selected such that each ion pair creates an avalanche, but by the emission of UV photons, multiple avalanches are created which spread along the anode wire, and the adjacent gas volume ionizes from as little as a single ion pair event. This is the "Geiger region" of operation. The current pulses produced by the ionising events are passed to processing electronics which can derive a visual display of count rate or radiation dose, and usually in the case of hand-held instruments, an audio device producing clicks.

The advantages are that they are a cheap and robust detector with a large variety of sizes and applications, large output signal is produced from tube which requires minimal electronic processing for simple counting, and it can measure the overall gamma dose when using an energy compensated tube.

The disadvantages are that it cannot measure the energy of the radiation (no spectrographic information), it will not measure high radiation rates due to dead time, and sustained high radiation levels will degrade fill gas.

== Guidance on detector type usage ==
The UK Health and Safety Executive has issued a guidance note on the correct portable instrument for the application concerned. This covers all radiation instrument technologies and is useful in selecting the correct gaseous ionisation detector technology for a measurement application.

== Everyday use ==
Ionization-type smoke detectors are gaseous ionization detectors in widespread use. A small source of radioactive americium is placed so that it maintains a current between two plates that effectively form an ionisation chamber. If smoke gets between the plates where ionization is taking place, the ionized gas can be neutralized leading to a reduced current. The decrease in current triggers a fire alarm.

== See also ==
- Stopping power of radiation particles
