= Erwin Gabathuler =

Nuclear physicist

Erwin Gabathuler (16 November 1933 – 31 August 2016) was a particle physicist from Northern Ireland.

== Early life ==
Erwin Gabathuler was born in Maghera, County Londonderry, Northern Ireland on 16 November 1933, a son of the manager of the Swiss embroidery factory. He attended Rainey Endowed School, Magherafelt, and then Queen's University Belfast. There he studied physics, and was awarded BSc in 1956, and MSc in 1957 for a thesis on "Electron Collision Cross-sections of Atmospheric Gases". He then moved to the University of Glasgow to work at the 300 MeV synchrotron there, and was awarded a PhD in 1961.

== Career ==
He researched at Cornell University, USA from 1961–1964, then Daresbury Laboratory, Cheshire 1965-1974. He began work at CERN in 1974, as a scientific attaché from the Rutherford Laboratory, Didcot, eventually becoming a direct employee at CERN in 1978 for a 4-year appointment as Head of the Experimental Physics Division, taking over from Emilio Picasso. He spent 1983-2002 at the University of Liverpool as professor of Physics and head of the particle physics group, maintaining his connections with CERN. When he retired, the University of Liverpool organised an "ErwinFest" to celebrate his career.

== Awards and decorations ==
He was elected to the Royal Society on 15 March 1990 and received the Rutherford Medal and Prize in 1992 (with Terry Sloan) from the Institute of Physics. He was made an Officer of the Order of the British Empire in 2001 for services to physics.

He received two honorary degrees, an honorary doctorate from the Faculty of Mathematics and Science at Uppsala University, Sweden in 1982., and a D.Sc. from Queen's University, Belfast in 1997.

== Research and achievements ==
According to INSPIRE-HEP, Gabathuler co-authored more than 1200 published papers.

He was one of the founding fathers of the European Muon Collaboration at CERN.

=== Academic Papers published 1958-1977 ===
- Stewart, D T; Gabathuler, E (1 July 1958). "Some Electron Collision Cross Sections for Nitrogen and Oxygen". Proceedings of the Physical Society. 72 (2). IOP Publishing: 287–289. doi:10.1088/0370-1328/72/2/421. ISSN 0370-1328.
- Stewart, D T; Gabathuler, E (1 September 1959). "Electron Collision Cross Sections in Helium". Proceedings of the Physical Society. 74 (4). IOP Publishing: 473–477. Bibcode:1959PPS....74..473S. doi:10.1088/0370-1328/74/4/312. ISSN 0370-1328.
- Scobie, J; Gabathuler, E (1 August 1958). "The L/K-Capture Ratio in ^{126}I". Proceedings of the Physical Society. 72 (3). IOP Publishing: 437–440. Bibcode:1958PPS....72..437S. doi:10.1088/0370-1328/72/3/315. ISSN 0370-1328.
- Lewis, G.M.; Gabathuler, E.; Azuma, R.E. (1960). "On the Separation of π^{+} Mesons by a Time of Flight Method". Nuclear Instruments and Methods. 8 (2). Elsevier BV: 230–232. Bibcode:1960NucIM...8..230L. doi:10.1016/s0029-554x(60)80012-2. ISSN 0029-554X.
- Lewis, G. M.; Azuma, R. E.; Gabathuler, E.; Leith, D. W. G. S.; Hogg, W. R. (1 December 1961). "Photoproduction of Positive Pions from Hydrogen near Threshold". Physical Review. 125 (1). American Physical Society (APS): 378–384. doi:10.1103/physrev.125.378. ISSN 0031-899X.
- Anderson, R. L.; Gabathuler, E.; Jones, D.; McDaniel, B. D.; Sadoff, A. J. (1 July 1962). "Photoproduction of K^{+} Mesons in Hydrogen". Physical Review Letters. 9 (3). American Physical Society (APS): 131–133. Bibcode:1962PhRvL...9..131A. doi:10.1103/physrevlett.9.131. ISSN 0031-9007.
- Photoproduction of strange particles, Proceedings of International Conference on High Energy Physics at CERN, p. 266-269, 1962.
- Thom, H.; Gabathuler, E.; Jones, D.; McDaniel, B. D.; Woodward, W. M. (1 October 1963). "Polarization of Λ° Hyperons from Photoproduction in Hydrogen". Physical Review Letters. 11 (9). American Physical Society (APS): 433–435. Bibcode:1963PhRvL..11..433T. doi:10.1103/physrevlett.11.433. ISSN 0031-9007.
- Photoproduction of K^{+}Σ° in hydrogen, Bull. Am. Phys. Soc., 9, 22, 1964 - complete results given here only.
- Photoproduction of K^{+} meson from hydrogen, Proceedings of International Conference on Electron and Photon Interactions at High Energies, p. 203-206, Hamburg, 1965.
- Biggs, P. J.; Braben, D. W.; Clifft, R. W.; Gabathuler, E.; Kitching, P.; Rand, R. E. (20 October 1969). "Experimental Test of Quantum Electrodynamics by Photoproduction of Wide-Angle Electron Pairs from Hydrogen". Physical Review Letters. 23 (16). American Physical Society (APS): 927–930. Bibcode:1969PhRvL..23..927B. doi:10.1103/physrevlett.23.927. ISSN 0031-9007.
- Biggs, P. J.; Braben, D. W.; Clifft, R. W.; Gabathuler, E.; Kitching, P.; Rand, R. E. (25 May 1970). "Observation of ρ−ω Interference in the Photoproduction of Electron-Positron Pairs from Carbon and a Measurement of the ρ−ω Phase". Physical Review Letters. 24 (21). American Physical Society (APS): 1197–1201. doi:10.1103/physrevlett.24.1197. ISSN 0031-9007.
- Biggs, P. J.; Clifft, R. W.; Gabathuler, E.; Kitching, P.; Rand, R. E. (25 May 1970). "Measurement of the Magnitude and Phase of ρ−ω Interference in π^{+}ω^{−} Photoproduction from Carbon". Physical Review Letters. 24 (21). American Physical Society (APS): 1201–1205. doi:10.1103/physrevlett.24.1201. ISSN 0031-9007.
- Biggs, P. J.; Braben, D. W.; Clifft, R. W.; Gabathuler, E.; Kitching, P.; Rand, R. E. (1 February 1970). "Photoproduction of Electron Pairs as a Test of Quantum Electrodynamics". Physical Review D. 1 (5). American Physical Society (APS): 1252–1266. Bibcode:1970PhRvD...1.1252B. doi:10.1103/physrevd.1.1252. ISSN 0556-2821.
- Evidence for the ω-2π Decay by ρ-ω Interference in Vector Meson Photoproduction. Invited Paper at International Conference on Experimental Meson Spectroscopy. - Experimental Meson Spectroscopy, Columbia University Press p. 645-655, 1970.
- Interference Effects in High Energy Vector Meson Photoproduction. Review Paper in Vector Meson Production and Omega-Rho Interference . p. 115-138, DNPL/R7, June 1970.
- Biggs, P. J.; Braben, D. W.; Clifft, R. W.; Gabathuler, E.; Rand, R. E. (25 October 1971). "Determination of the Real Part of the ρ-Nucleon Forward Scattering Amplitude and the Relative ρ−ω Production Phase". Physical Review Letters. 27 (17). American Physical Society (APS): 1157–1160. doi:10.1103/physrevlett.27.1157. ISSN 0031-9007.
- Gabathuler, E (1 February 1972). "Vector mesons". Journal of Physics A: General Physics. 5 (3). IOP Publishing: 327–347. doi:10.1088/0305-4470/5/3/003. ISSN 0022-3689.
- Experimental Programme at the Daresbury Laboratory. Invited Talk Photon and Lepton Physics in Europe — DNPL R.11, 1972.
- Experimental Utilisation at the NINA Booster - DNPL R13 Vol. II, 1972.
- A High Intensity Muon Beam at the S.P.S., Vol. I. Proceedings of the Tirrenia Study Week, p. 208, CERN/ECFA/72/4, 1972.
- Total Cross—Sections — Rapporteur Talk at the Proceedings of the 6th International Symposium on Electron and Photon Interactions at High Energies, Bonn 1973.
- Brookes, G.R.; Gabathuler, E.; Rawlinson, W.R.; Shiel, C.; Tolfree, D.W.L. (1974). "A high resolution photon tagging system in the GeV region". Nuclear Instruments and Methods. 115 (2). Elsevier BV: 465–469. Bibcode:1974NucIM.115..465B. doi:10.1016/0029-554x(74)90248-1. ISSN 0029-554X.
- Barker, I.S.; Gabathuler, E.; Storrow, J.K. (1974). "ωPhotoproduction off neutrons: A test of A_{2} peripherality". Nuclear Physics B. 78 (3). Elsevier BV: 515–524. Bibcode:1974NuPhB..78..515B. doi:10.1016/0550-3213(74)90595-1. ISSN 0550-3213.
- Clifft, R. W.; Gabathuler, E.; Littenberg, L. S.; Marshall, R.; Rock, S. E.; Thompson, J. C.; Ward, D. L.; Brookes, G. R. (16 December 1974). "Search for ΔI=2 Electromagnetic Currents in Pion Photoproduction". Physical Review Letters. 33 (25). American Physical Society (APS): 1500–1503. Bibcode:1974PhRvL..33.1500C. doi:10.1103/physrevlett.33.1500. ISSN 0031-9007.
- Clifft, R.W.; Dainton, J.B.; Gabathuler, E.; Littenberg, L.S.; Marshall, R.; Rock, S.E.; Thompson, J.C.; Ward, D.L.; Brookes, G.R. (1976). "Backward photoproduction of ρ° and f between 2.8 GeV and 4.8 GeV". Physics Letters B. 64 (2). Elsevier BV: 213–216. Bibcode:1976PhLB...64..213C. doi:10.1016/0370-2693(76)90335-x. ISSN 0370-2693.
