= NA48 experiment =

Particle physics experiments

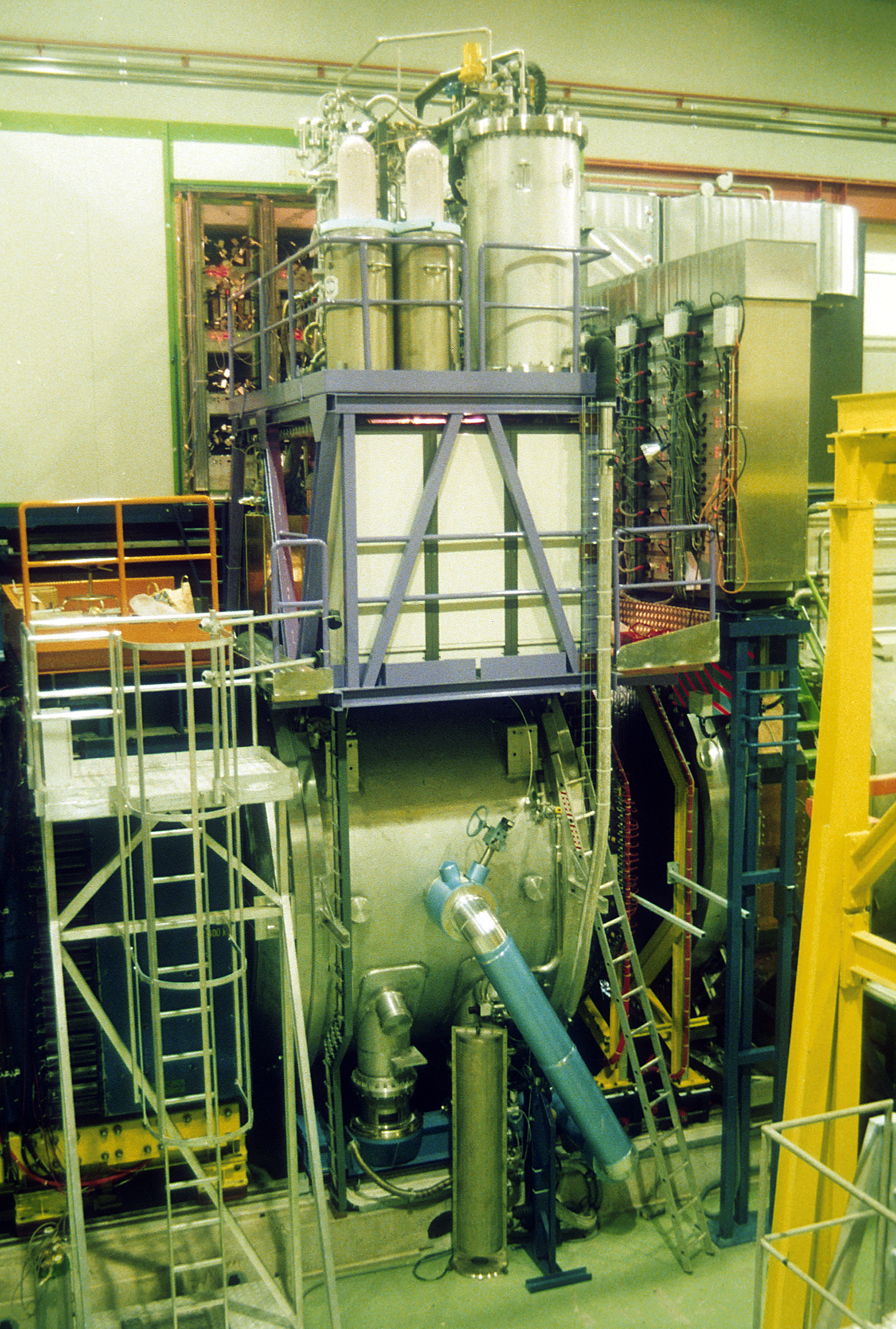
Part of the NA48 setup: a liquid krypton electromagnetic calorimeter.

The NA48 experiment was a series of particle physics experiments in the field of kaon physics being carried out at the North Area of the Super Proton Synchrotron at CERN. The collaboration involved over 100 physicists mostly from Western Europe and Russia.

The construction of the NA48 experimental setup took place early 1990s. The primary physics goal – the search for direct CP violation – was inherited from the predecessor NA31 experiment. The physics data taking runs took place between 1997 and 2001. The discovery of the phenomenon of direct CP violation, one of the most important experimental results obtained at CERN, was announced by the collaboration in 1999. The publication of the final result was made in 2001. In addition the experiment made a contribution to studies of rare decays of neutral kaons.

The following stage of the experiment (NA48/1) was carried out in 2002 and was devoted to high precision study of rare decays of neutral kaons and hyperons. The next stage (NA48/2) was carried out in 2003–2004 and was dedicated to a large programme of studies of properties of charged kaons, including the search of direct CP violation, studies of rare decays of the charged kaon, and low-energy QCD using final state rescattering.

The successor of NA48 series of experiments at CERN is the NA62 experiment, which collected a dedicated dataset for a lepton flavour university test in kaon decays using the NA48/2 setup in 2007, and a very large dataset of charged kaon decays using a dedicated setup in 2016–2026.

== See also ==
- NA31 experiment
- NA62 experiment
