= Proportional counter =

Gaseous ionization detector

The proportional counter is a type of gaseous ionization detector device used to measure particles of ionizing radiation. The key feature is its ability to measure the energy of incident radiation, by producing a detector output pulse that is proportional to the radiation energy absorbed by the detector due to an ionizing event; hence the detector's name. It is widely used where energy levels of incident radiation must be known, such as in the discrimination between alpha and beta particles, or accurate measurement of X-ray radiation dose.

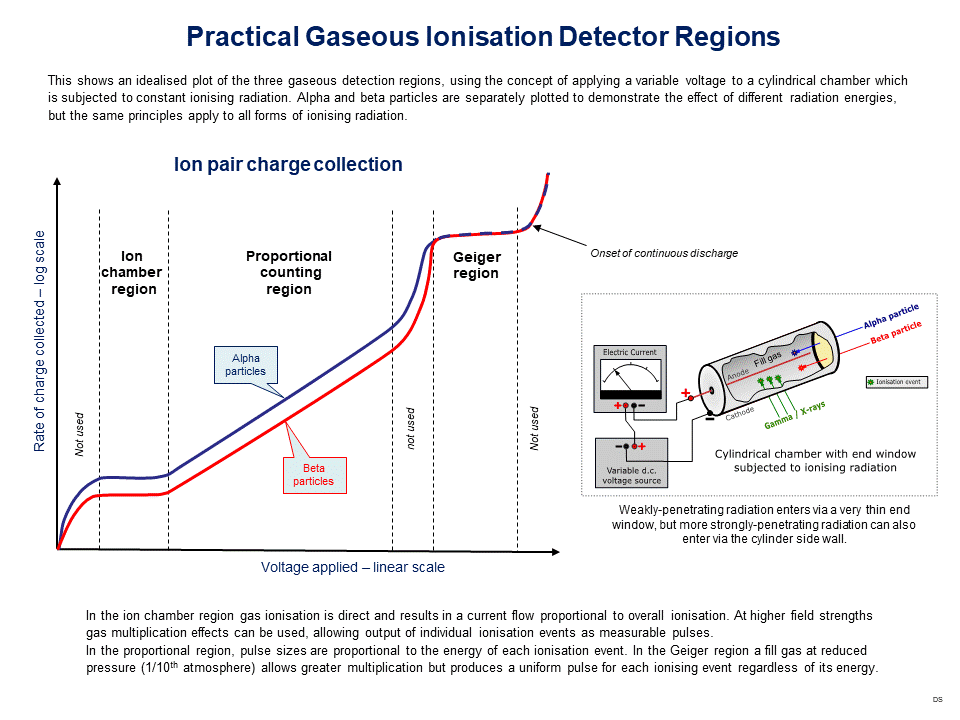
Plot of variation of ion pair current against applied voltage for a wire cylinder gaseous radiation detector.

A proportional counter uses a combination of the mechanisms of a Geiger–Müller tube and an ionization chamber, and operates in an intermediate voltage region between these. The accompanying plot shows the proportional counter operating voltage region for a co-axial cylinder arrangement.

== Operation ==
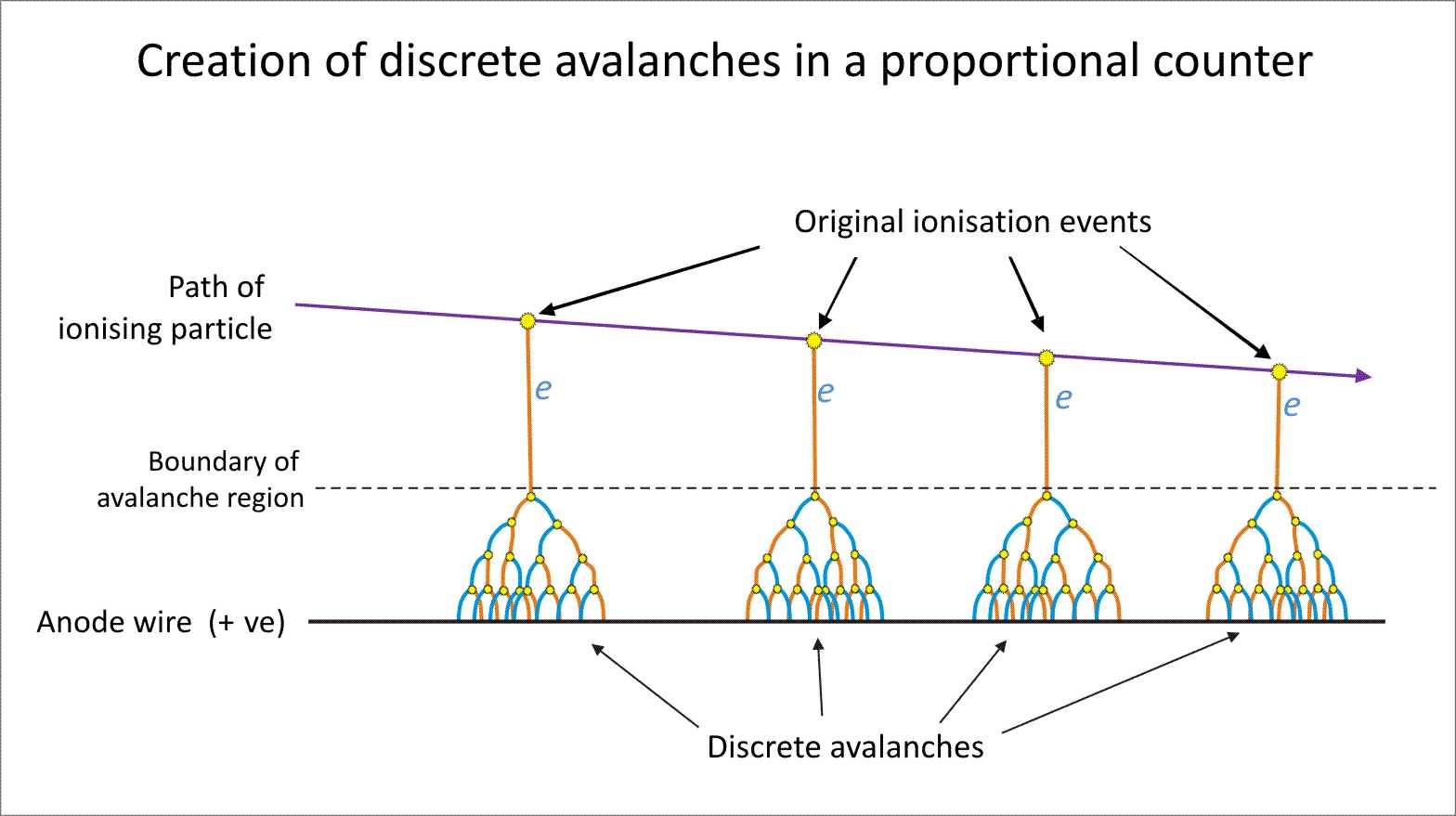
The generation of discrete Townsend avalanches in a proportional counter.

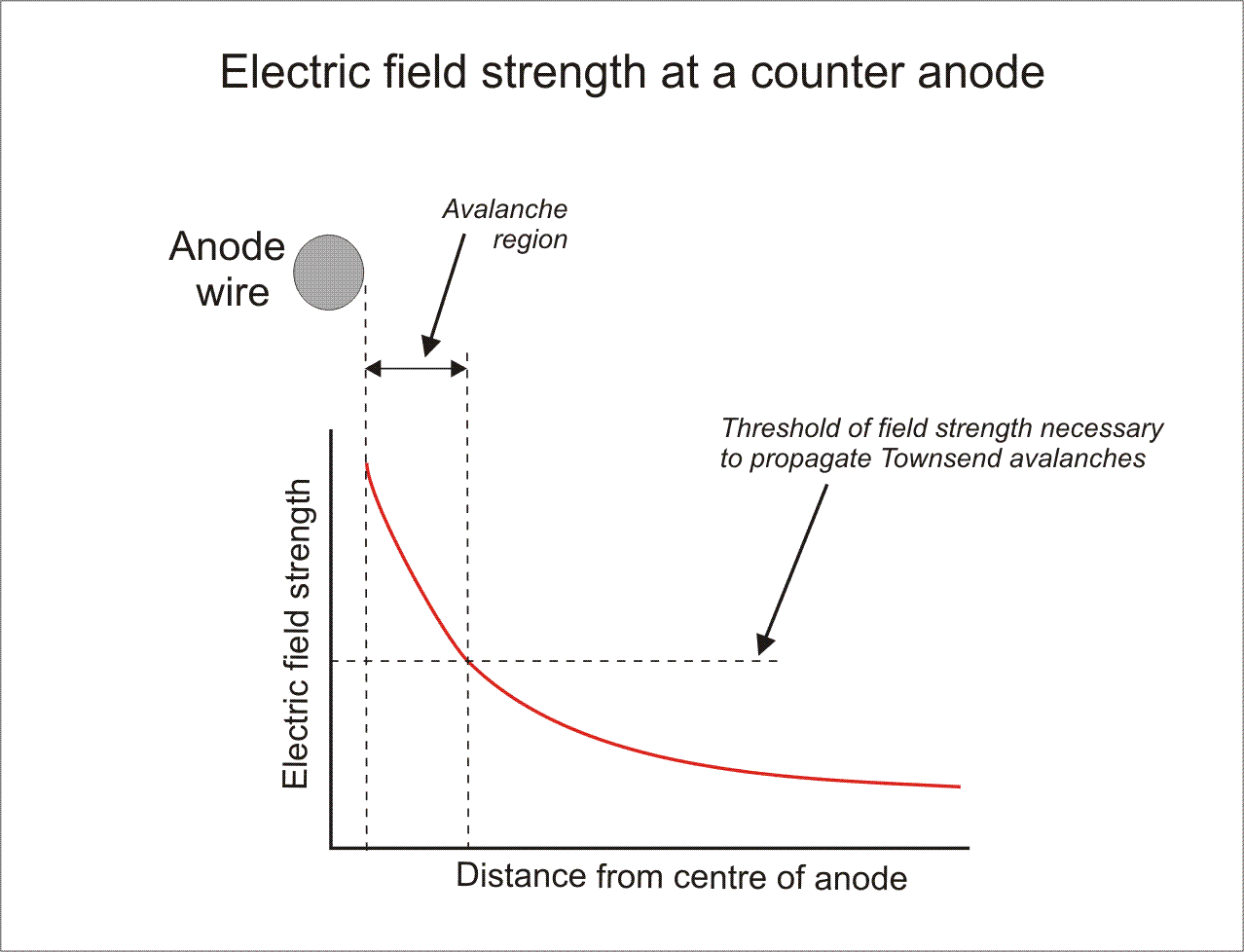
Plot of electric field strength at the anode, showing the boundary of avalanche region.

In a proportional counter the fill gas of the chamber is an inert gas which is ionized by incident radiation, and a quench gas to ensure each pulse discharge terminates; a common mixture is 90% argon, 10% methane, known as P-10. An ionizing particle entering the gas collides with an atom of the inert gas and ionizes it to produce an electron and a positively charged ion, commonly known as an "ion pair". As the ionizing particle travels through the chamber it leaves a trail of ion pairs along its trajectory, the number of which is proportional to the energy of the particle if it is fully stopped within the gas. Typically a 1 MeV stopped particle will create about 30,000 ion pairs.

The chamber geometry and the applied voltage is such that in most of the chamber the electric field strength is low and the chamber acts as an ion chamber. However, the field is strong enough to prevent re-combination of the ion pairs and causes positive ions to drift towards the cathode and electrons towards the anode. This is the "ion drift" region. In the immediate vicinity of the anode wire, the field strength becomes large enough to produce Townsend avalanches. This avalanche region occurs only fractions of a millimeter from the anode wire, which itself is of a very small diameter. The purpose of this is to use the multiplication effect of the avalanche produced by each ion pair. This is the "avalanche" region.

A key design goal is that each original ionizing event due to incident radiation produces only one avalanche. This is to ensure proportionality between the number of original events and the total ion current. For this reason, the applied voltage, the geometry of the chamber and the diameter of the anode wire are critical to ensure proportional operation. If avalanches start to self-multiply due to UV photons as they do in a Geiger–Muller tube, then the counter enters a region of "limited proportionality" until at a higher applied voltage the Geiger discharge mechanism occurs with complete ionization of the gas enveloping the anode wire and consequent loss of particle energy information.

Therefore, it can be said that the proportional counter has the key design feature of two distinct ionization regions:

1. Ion drift region: in the outer volume of the chamber – the creation of number ion pairs proportional to incident radiation energy.
2. Avalanche region: in the immediate vicinity of the anode – charge amplification of ion pair currents, while maintaining localized avalanches.

The process of charge amplification greatly improves the signal-to-noise ratio of the detector and reduces the subsequent electronic amplification required.

In summary, the proportional counter is an ingenious combination of two ionization mechanisms in one chamber which finds wide practical use.

=== Gas mixtures ===
Usually the detector is filled with a noble gas; they have the lowest ionization voltages and do not degrade chemically. Typically neon, argon, krypton or xenon are used. Low-energy x-rays are best detected with lighter nuclei (neon), which are less sensitive to higher-energy photons. Krypton or xenon are chosen when for higher-energy x-rays or for higher desired efficiency.

Often the main gas is mixed with a quenching additive. A popular mixture is P10 (10% methane, 90% argon).

Typical working pressure is 1 atmosphere (about 100 kPa).

== Signal amplification by multiplication ==
In the case of a cylindrical proportional counter the multiplication, M, of the signal caused by an avalanche can be modeled as follows:

$$\ln M=\frac{V}{\ln(b/a)}\frac{\ln 2}{\Delta V_{\lambda}}\left[\ln\left(\frac{V}{pa\ln(b/a)}\right)-\ln K\right]$$

Where a is the anode wire radius, b is the radius of the counter, p is the pressure of the gas, and V is the operating voltage. K is a property of the gas used and relates the energy needed to cause an avalanche to the pressure of the gas. The final term $\Delta V_{\lambda}$ gives the change in voltage caused by an avalanche.

== Applications ==
=== Spectroscopy ===
The proportionality between the energy of the charged particle traveling through the chamber and the total charge created makes proportional counters useful for charged particle spectroscopy. By measuring the total charge (time integral of the electric current) between the electrodes, we can determine the particle's kinetic energy because the number of ion pairs created by the incident ionizing charged particle is proportional to its energy. The energy resolution of a proportional counter, however, is limited because both the initial ionization event and the subsequent 'multiplication' event are subject to statistical fluctuations characterized by a standard deviation equal to the square root of the average number formed. However, in practice these are not as great as would be predicted due to the effect of the empirical Fano factor which reduces these fluctuations. In the case of argon, this is experimentally about 0.2.

=== Photon detection ===
Proportional counters are also useful for detection of high energy photons, such as gamma-rays, provided these can penetrate the entrance window. They are also used for the detection of X-rays to below 1 keV energy levels, using thin-walled tubes operating at or around atmospheric pressure.

=== Radioactive contamination detection ===
Proportional counters in the form of large area planar detectors are used extensively to check for radioactive contamination on personnel, flat surfaces, tools, and items of clothing. This is normally in the form of installed instrumentation because of the difficulties of providing portable gas supplies for hand-held devices. They are constructed with a large area detection window made from such as metalized mylar which forms one wall of the detection chamber and is part of the cathode. The anode wire is routed in a convoluted manner within the detector chamber to optimize the detection efficiency. They are normally used to detect alpha and beta particles, and can enable discrimination between them by providing a pulse output proportional to the energy deposited in the chamber by each particle. They have a high efficiency for beta, but lower for alpha. The efficiency reduction for alpha is due to the attenuation effect of the entry window, though distance from the surface being checked also has a significant effect, and ideally a source of alpha radiation should be less than 10mm from the detector due to attenuation in air.

These chambers operate at very slight positive pressure above ambient atmospheric pressure. The gas can be sealed in the chamber, or can be changed continuously, in which case they are known as "gas-flow proportional counters". Gas flow types have the advantage that they will tolerate small holes in the mylar screen which can occur in use, but they do require a continuous gas supply.

=== Guidance on application use ===
In the United Kingdom the Health and Safety Executive (HSE) has issued a user guidance note on selecting the correct radiation measurement instrument for the application concerned. This covers all radiation instrument technologies and is a useful comparative guide to the use of proportional counters.

== See also ==
- Gaseous ionization detectors
- Micropattern gaseous detector
- Multiwire proportional chamber
