= NA31 experiment =

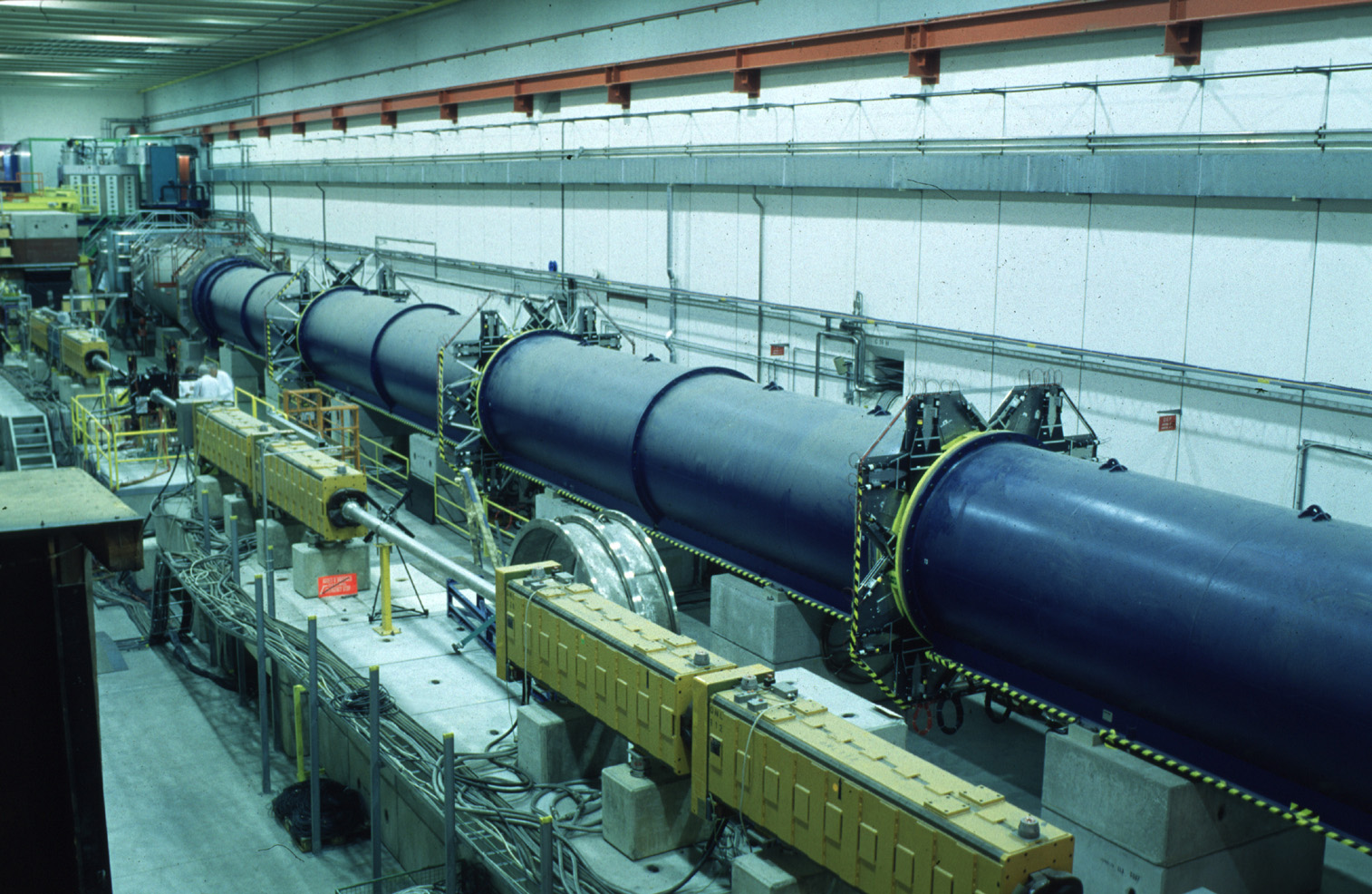
NA31 experiment (same tube as NA48)

NA31 is a CERN experiment which was proposed in 1982 as a measurement of |η_{00} /η_{+-}|^{2} by the CERN-Edinburgh-Mainz-Pisa-Siegen collaboration. It took data between 1986 and 1989, using a proton beam from the SPS through the K4 neutral beam-line. Its aim was to experimentally prove direct CP-violation.

== CP violation ==
While charge symmetry and parity symmetry are both violated for any transformation under the weak interaction, the CP violation is known only to appear in particular phenomena - kaon and B-meson decays - under the weak interaction.

CP-violation was first theoretically developed for the Standard Model by Kobayashi and Maskawa in 1973 when they introduced a third generation of quark (bottom and top) and thus extended the Cabibbo matrix to the 3x3 CKM matrix, parameterizing the couplings between quark-mass eigenstates and the charge weak gauge bosons. CP violation then appears through the presence of complex parameters in this matrix.

Determined from the relative decay rates of short- and long-lived neutral kaons into two neutral and charged pions, respectively, the so-called ε'/ε ratio which expresses the relative strength of direct CP-violation was known to be small but expected to be different from zero in the Standard Model. The measurement of this small deviation from zero was the aim of NA31 in order to prove the existence of direct CP-violation in kaon decays under weak interaction.

== Evolution of the experiment ==
NA31 found the first evidence for direct CP violation in 1988 with a ratio deviating about three standards from zero. However, shortly after, another experiment – E731 at Fermilab – reported a measurement consistent with zero. A better precision was needed by both NA31 and Fermilab to find consistent results and thus to allow a final conclusion. A new generation of detectors were thus built, both at CERN (for what became the NA48 experiment) and at Fermilab (KTeV). Finally, in 1999, the two new experiments confirmed both direct CP violation in the decay of neutral kaons (CERN Courier September 1999 p32), a discovery which was later recognized by honours, as one of the most important discoveries made at CERN. In particular the 2005 European Physics Society High Energy and Particle Physics Prize was awarded jointly to the NA31 Collaboration and its spokesman Heinrich Wahl.

== The detector ==
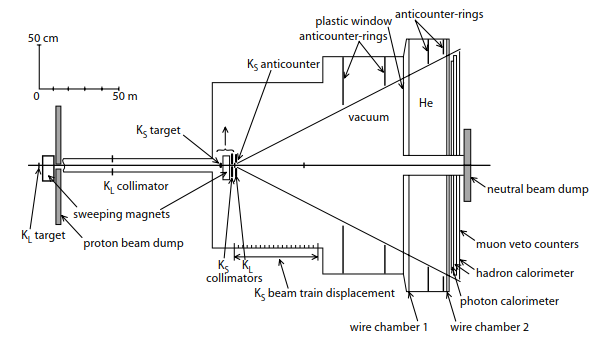
Layout of the NA31 experiment.

The detector was compounded by wire chambers combined with calorimetry in order to determine K^{0} parameters (e.g. energy, decay vertex). A great precision on these parameters is required to define well the phase space for all the decay modes which are to be compared. It consists of :

- an evacuated decay region.
- proportional wires chambers to measure the charged pion direction.
- liquid argon calorimeter with a good energy and position resolution to measure the photons from the pion decay.
- a hadron calorimeter to measure the energy of the charged pions.
- a plane of scintillation counters serving as muon identifiers.

== See also ==
- List of SPS experiments
- NA48
- NA62
