= Nucleon spin structure =

Property of protons and neutrons

In particle physics, nucleon spin structure describes the partonic structure of nucleon (proton and neutron) intrinsic angular momentum (spin). The key question is how the nucleon's spin, whose magnitude is 1/2ħ, is carried by its constituent partons (quarks and gluons). It was originally expected before the 1980s that quarks carry all of the nucleon spin, but later experiments contradict this expectation. In the late 1980s, the European Muon Collaboration (EMC) conducted experiments that suggested the spin carried by quarks is not sufficient to account for the total spin of the nucleons. This finding astonished particle physicists at that time, and the problem of where the missing spin lies is sometimes referred to as the proton spin crisis.

Experimental research on these topics has been continued by the Spin Muon Collaboration (SMC) and the COMPASS experiment at CERN, experiments E142, E143, E154 and E155 at SLAC, HERMES at DESY, experiments at JLab and RHIC, and others. Global analysis of data from all major experiments confirmed the original EMC discovery and showed that the quark spin did contribute about 30% to the total spin of the nucleon. A major topic of modern particle physics is to find the missing angular momentum, which is believed to be carried either by gluon spin, or by gluon and quark orbital angular momentum. This fact is expressed by the sum rule,

$$\frac{1}{2} =\frac{1}{2}  \Sigma_q + \Sigma_g + L_q + L_g.$$

The gluon spin components $\Sigma_g$ are being measured by many experiments. Quark and gluon angular momenta will be studied by measuring so-called generalized parton distributions (GPD) through deeply virtual compton scattering (DVCS) experiments, conducted at CERN (COMPASS) and at Jefferson Lab, among other laboratories.
