= European Muon Collaboration =

Series of particle physics experiments at CERN (1972–1978)

The European Muon Collaboration (EMC) was a consortium of particle physicists formed in 1973 to study the interactions of high energy muons at CERN. These experiments were motivated by the interest in determining the quark structure of the nucleon following the discovery of high levels of deep inelastic scattering at SLAC.

In 1972 two muon beams were proposed for the then new Super Proton Synchrotron (SPS) machine. One by Roger Clifft and Erwin Gabathuler and one by Friedhelm Brasse and Joerg Gayler. The two teams came together to design a high intensity muon beam of energy up to 280 GeV to do the experiments. The collaboration, which became known as the European Muon Collaboration (EMC), was formed around these people to carry out the experiments. A proposal for the beam and an apparatus to do the experiments was submitted to CERN in 1974 (the White Book). The experiments were approved and the apparatus was built between 1974–1978. The collaboration grew in size to about 100 physicists. This was among the largest experimental collaborations at the time.

Several experiments were performed. Each experiment is denoted by a number NAxx where NA is for North Area experiments approved by CERN and xx is the number given to it by CERN.

== EMC experiments ==
=== NA2 : Electromagnetic interactions of muons ===
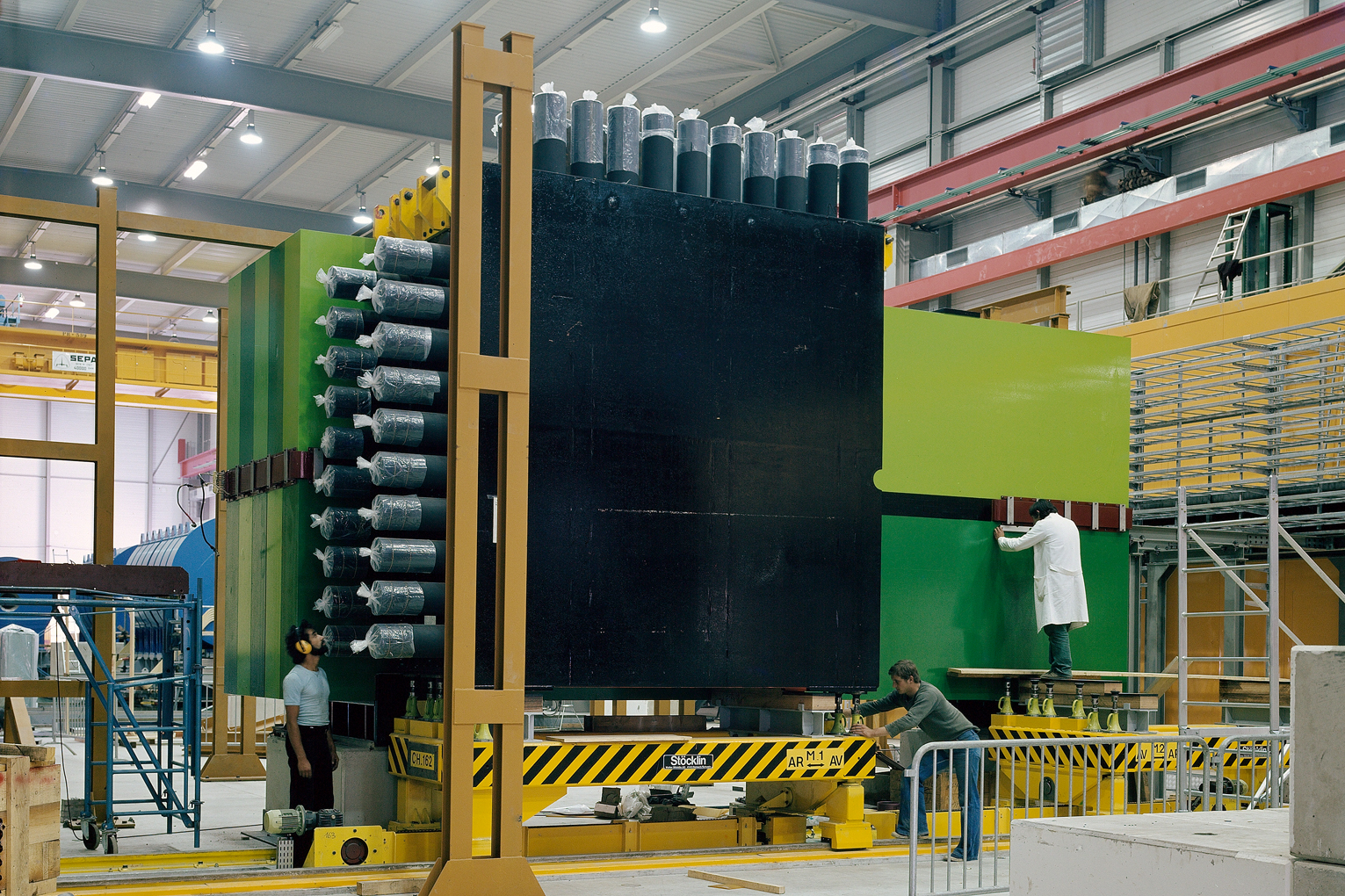
NA2 EMC apparatus being assembled in EHN2.

NA2 was a single magnet spectrometer to measure the forward production products of deep inelastic scattering by muons. Data were taken for this experiment between 1978–1981.

=== NA9 : Study of final states in deep inelastic muon scattering ===
For this experiment a second magnet containing a streamer chamber was added upstream of the NA2 apparatus to detect and measure the products of the deep inelastic scattering reactions at wider angles. Further groups joined the EMC for these experiments and the collaboration grew to about 150 physicists. The experiments were performed between 1981–1983.

=== NA28 : Study of shadowing and hadron production in high energy μ scattering using nuclear targets ===
During the NA9 phase, a state of the art (at the time) processor was installed by the University of Uppsala group to trigger on scattered muons at very small angles to the beam (this was the NA28 experiment). This experiment was designed to investigate shadowing in nuclei. From 1984–1985 the experiment reverted to the single magnet spectrometer of NA2 and a large polarized target together with subsidiary nuclear targets were installed.

== Major results of the experiments ==
The first results of the NA2 phase of the experiment showed that charm production was mediated by the photon-gluon fusion process. The collaboration then went on to show that the scattering rate in iron and deuterium were different. This showed that the quark sub-structure of nucleons bound in nuclei is different from that of free nucleons. The effect became known as the EMC effect and aroused great interest among theoretical physicists. It was planned to replace the iron, deuterium and hydrogen targets with a polarized target in 1981. However, it proved to be difficult to build the large volume target necessary and this experiment was postponed until 1984. In addition the Lund model of quark fragmentation (which later became known as PYTHIA) became available and much of the data on forward produced hadrons were used to tune this model.

The NA9/NA28 phases of the experiment commenced taking data in 1981. The main results of these experiments were the confirmation of our understanding of the quark fragmentation process. Again the results were used to develop models of this process such as PYTHIA and the HERWIG model which had become available. The NA28 experiment discovered that the results of scattering in nuclei at small values of Bjorken x were much different from those at larger values. The process governing this behavior became known as shadowing in nuclei.

The final phase of the experiment with the polarized target produced the most dramatic result from the experiment with the discovery only a small part of the proton spin is carried by quarks, and that the strange quark sea is probably polarized. This is sometimes referred to as the "proton spin crisis".

== See also ==
- Neutron detection
- Nucleon spin structure
