= Micropattern gaseous detector =

Type of gaseous ionization detector

Micropattern gaseous detectors (MPGDs) are a group of gaseous ionization detectors consisting of microelectronic structures with sub-millimeter distances between anode and cathode electrodes. When interacting with the gaseous medium of the detector, particles of ionizing radiation create electrons and ions that are subsequently drifted apart by means of an electric field. The accelerated electrons create further electron-ion pairs in an avalanche process in regions with a strong electrostatic field. The various types of MPGDs differ in the way this strong field region is created. Examples of MPGDs include the microstrip gas chamber (developed by Anton Oed in 1988), the gas electron multiplier and the Micromegas detector.

The main advantages of MPGDs over previous types of gaseous detectors, such as the multiwire proportional chamber, are their count rate capability, time and position resolution, granularity, stability and radiation hardness.
