= Wire chamber =

Proportional counter that detects charged particles and photons

A wire chamber or multi-wire proportional chamber is a type of proportional counter that detects charged particles and photons and can give positional information on their trajectory, by tracking the trails of gaseous ionization. The technique was an improvement over the bubble chamber particle detection method, which used photographic techniques, as it allowed high speed electronics to track the particle path.

== Description ==
A wire chamber with anode wires (W) and cathode (−) plates (P). The particles travelling along trajectory T will ionize gas to produce ion pairs with free electrons which are multiplied by the Townsend avalanche effect at the anode wires to produce measurable current pulses.

The multi-wire chamber uses an array of anode wires, at a positive DC voltage, which run through a chamber with conductive walls held at a lower potential, which is the cathode. The chamber is filled with gas, such as an argon/methane mix, so that any ionizing particle that passes through the tube will ionize surrounding gaseous atoms and produce ion pairs, consisting of positive ions and electrons. These are accelerated by the electric field across the chamber, preventing recombination; the electrons are accelerated to the anode, and the positive ions to the cathode. At the anode a phenomenon known as a Townsend avalanche occurs. This results in a measurable current flow for each original ionising event which is proportional to the ionisation energy deposited by the detected particle. By separately measuring the current pulses from each wire, the particle trajectory can be found. Adaptations of this basic design are the thin gap, resistive plate and drift chambers. The drift chamber can also be subdivided into ranges of specific use in the chamber designs known as time projection, microstrip gas, and those types of detectors that use silicon.

== Development ==
Equipotential line and field line in a MWPC

In 1968, Georges Charpak, while at the European Organization for Nuclear Research (CERN), invented and developed the multi-wire proportional chamber (MWPC). This invention resulted in him winning the Nobel Prize for Physics in 1992. The chamber was an advancement of the earlier bubble chamber rate of detection of only one or two particles every second to 1000 particle detections every second. The MWPC produced electronic signals from particle detection, allowing scientists to examine data via computers. The multi-wire chamber is a development of the spark chamber.

== Fill gases ==
In a typical experiment, the chamber contains a mixture of these gases:

- argon (about 2/3)
- isobutane (just under 1/3)
- freon (0.5%)

The chamber could also be filled with:

- liquid xenon;
- liquid tetramethylsilane; or
- tetrakis(dimethylamino)ethylene (TMAE) vapour.

== Use ==
For high-energy physics experiments, it is used to observe a particle's path. For a long time, bubble chambers were used for this purpose, but with the improvement of electronics, it became desirable to have a detector with fast electronic read-out. (In bubble chambers, photographic exposures were made and the resulting printed photographs were then examined.) A wire chamber is a chamber with many parallel wires, arranged as a grid and put on high voltage, with the metal casing being on ground potential. As in the Geiger counter, a particle leaves a trace of ions and electrons, which drift toward the case or the nearest wire, respectively. By marking off the wires which had a pulse of current, one can see the particle's path.

The chamber has a very good relative time resolution, good positional accuracy, and self-triggered operation (Ferbel 1977).

The development of the chamber enabled scientists to study the trajectories of particles with much-improved precision, and also for the first time to observe and study the rarer interactions that occur through particle interaction.

== Drift chambers ==
If one also precisely measures the timing of the current pulses of the wires and takes into account that the ions need some time to drift to the nearest wire, one can infer the distance at which the particle passed the wire. This greatly increases the accuracy of the path reconstruction and is known as a drift chamber.

A drift chamber functions by balancing the loss of energy from particles caused by impacts with particles of gas with the accretion of energy created with high-energy electrical fields in use to cause the particle acceleration. Design is similar to the multi-wire proportional chamber but with a greater distance between central-layer wires. The detection of charged particles within the chamber is possible by the ionizing of gas particles due to the motion of the charged particle.

The Fermilab detector CDF II contains a drift chamber called the Central Outer Tracker. The chamber contains argon and ethane gas, and wires separated by 3.56-millimetre gaps.

If two drift chambers are used with the wires of one orthogonal to the wires of the other, both orthogonal to the beam direction, a more precise detection of the position is obtained. If an additional simple detector (like the one used in a veto counter) is used to detect, with poor or null positional resolution, the particle at a fixed distance before or after the wires, a tri-dimensional reconstruction can be made and the speed of the particle deduced from the difference in time of the passage of the particle in the different parts of the detector. This setup gives us a detector called a time projection chamber (TPC).

For measuring the velocity of the electrons in a gas (drift velocity) there are special drift chambers, velocity drift chambers, which measure the drift time for a known location of ionisation.

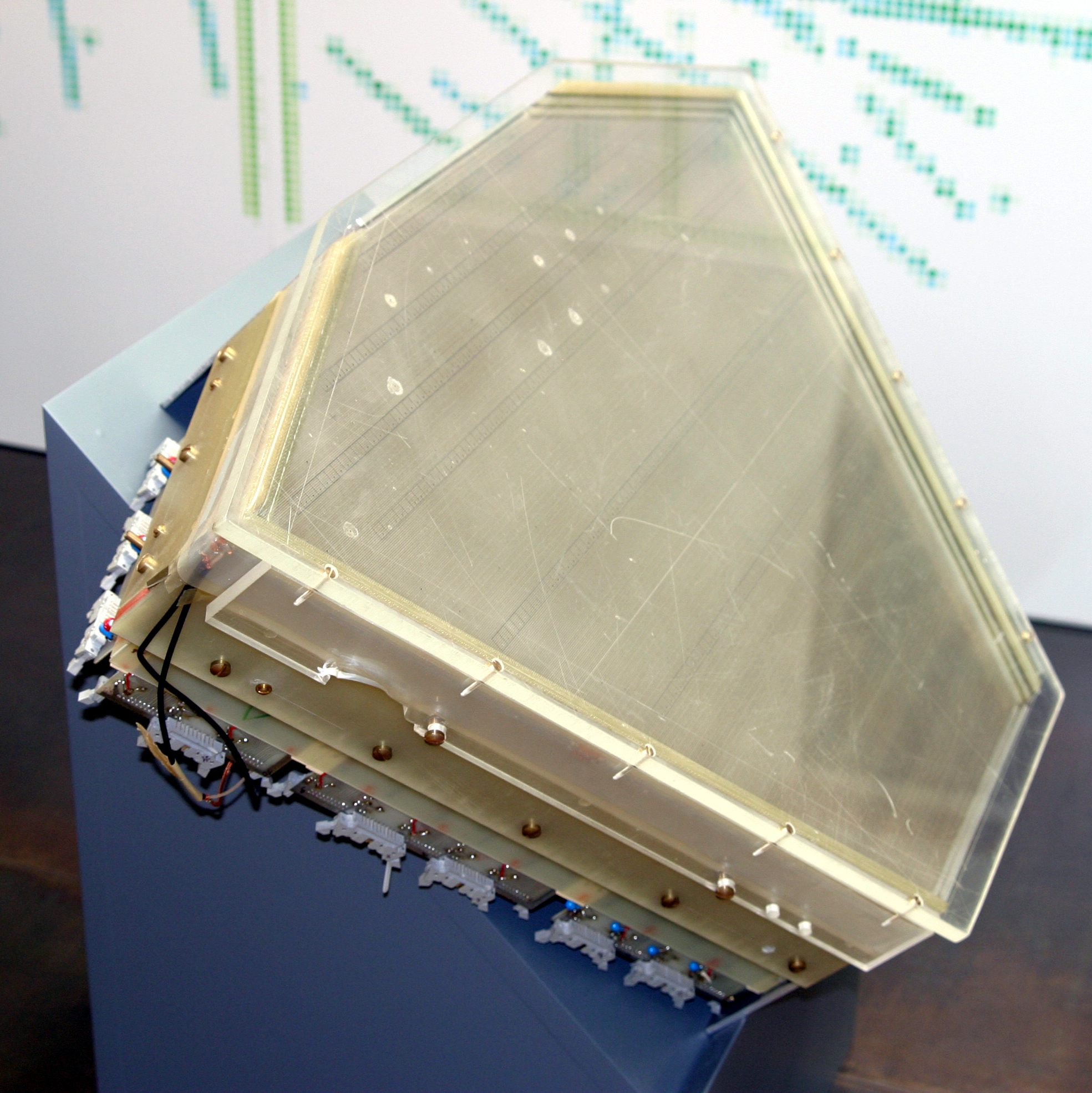
Cut-away showing interior of a drift chamber

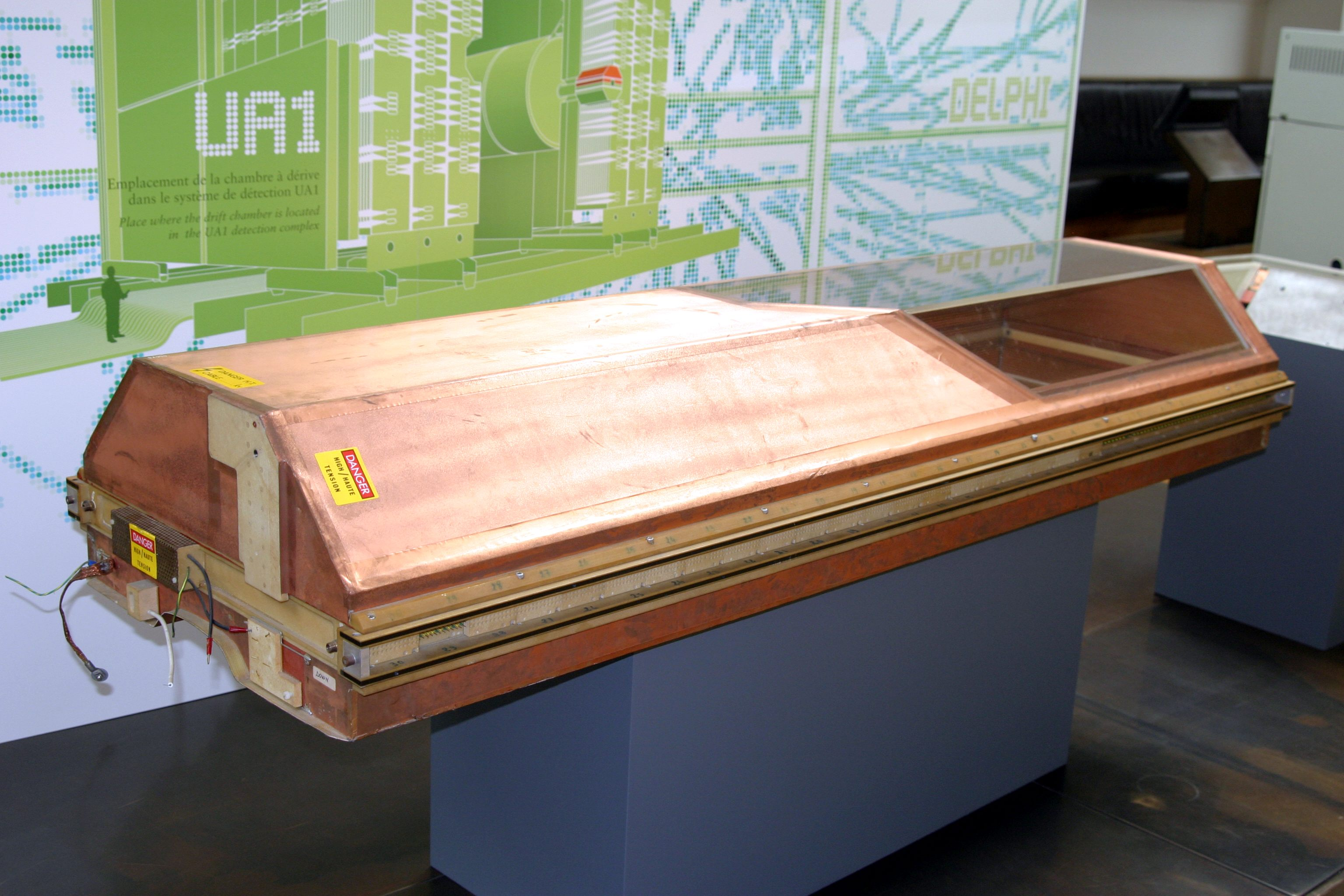
Drift chamber at the Musée des Arts et Métiers in Paris

== See also ==
- Bubble chamber
- Gaseous ionization detector
- Micropattern gaseous detector
- Particle detector
- Wilson chamber
