= BASE experiment =

Multinational collaboration

Antiproton decelerator (AD)
- ELENA: Extra low energy antiproton ring – further decelerates antiprotons coming from AD

AD experiments
- ATHENA: AD-1 Antihydrogen production and precision experiments
- ATRAP: AD-2 Cold antihydrogen for precise laser spectroscopy
- ASACUSA: AD-3 Atomic spectroscopy and collisions with antiprotons
- ACE: AD-4 Antiproton cell experiment
- ALPHA: AD-5 Antihydrogen laser physics apparatus
- AEgIS: AD-6 Antihydrogen experiment gravity interferometry spectroscopy
- GBAR: AD-7 Gravitational behaviour of anti-hydrogen at rest
- BASE: AD-8 Baryon antibaryon symmetry experiment
- PUMA: AD-9 Antiproton unstable matter annihilation

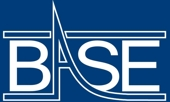
official BASE logo

BASE (Baryon Antibaryon Symmetry Experiment), AD-8, is a multinational collaboration at the Antiproton Decelerator facility at CERN, Geneva. The goal of the Japanese and German BASE collaboration are high-precision investigations of the fundamental properties of the antiproton, namely the charge-to-mass ratio and the magnetic moment.

== Experimental setup ==
The single antiprotons are stored in an advanced Penning trap system, which has a multi-trap system at its core. It consists of a reservoir trap, a precision trap, an analysis trap and a cooling trap. The reservoir trap has the capability to store antiprotons for several years and allows BASE to operate experiments independent from accelerator cycles. The precision trap is for high precision frequency measurements, and the analysis trap has a strong magnetic field inhomogeneity superimposed, which is used for single particle spin flip spectroscopy. By measuring the spin flip rate as a function of the frequency of an externally applied magnetic-drive, a resonance curve is obtained. Together with a measurement of the cyclotron frequency, the magnetic moment is extracted.

== BASE physics ==
The BASE collaboration developed techniques to observe the first spin flips of a single trapped proton and applied the double-trap technique to measure the magnetic moment of the proton with a fractional precision of three parts in a billion, later improved to a precision of 300 parts in a trillion, being the most precise measurement of this fundamental property of the proton. With the invention of a two particle/three trap technique BASE measured the antiproton magnetic moment with a fractional accuracy of 1.5 parts in a billion, which improved the previous most precise proton/antiproton comparison in that sector by more than a factor of 3000. This measurement constitutes one of the most stringent tests of CPT invariance with baryons to date, and sets the most stringent limits on antimatter/dark matter interaction to date.

Inspired by this work BASE has also used Penning trap detectors as axion haloscopes, and derived stringent narrow-band laboratory limits on the conversion of axions to photons.

In 2022 BASE measured that the charge-to-mass ratios of protons and antiprotons are equal within a precision of 16 parts per trillion. This measurement constitutes the most precise test of CPT invariance in the baryon sector and sets the first differential constraints on the clock weak equivalence principle using baryonic antimatter.

== BASE collaboration ==
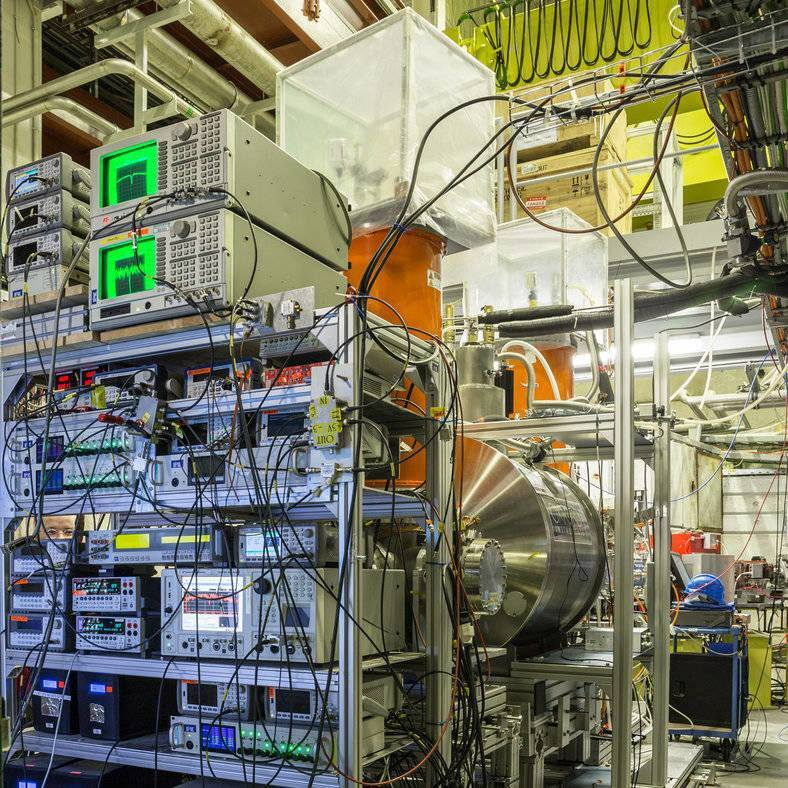
Views of the BASE experimental zone

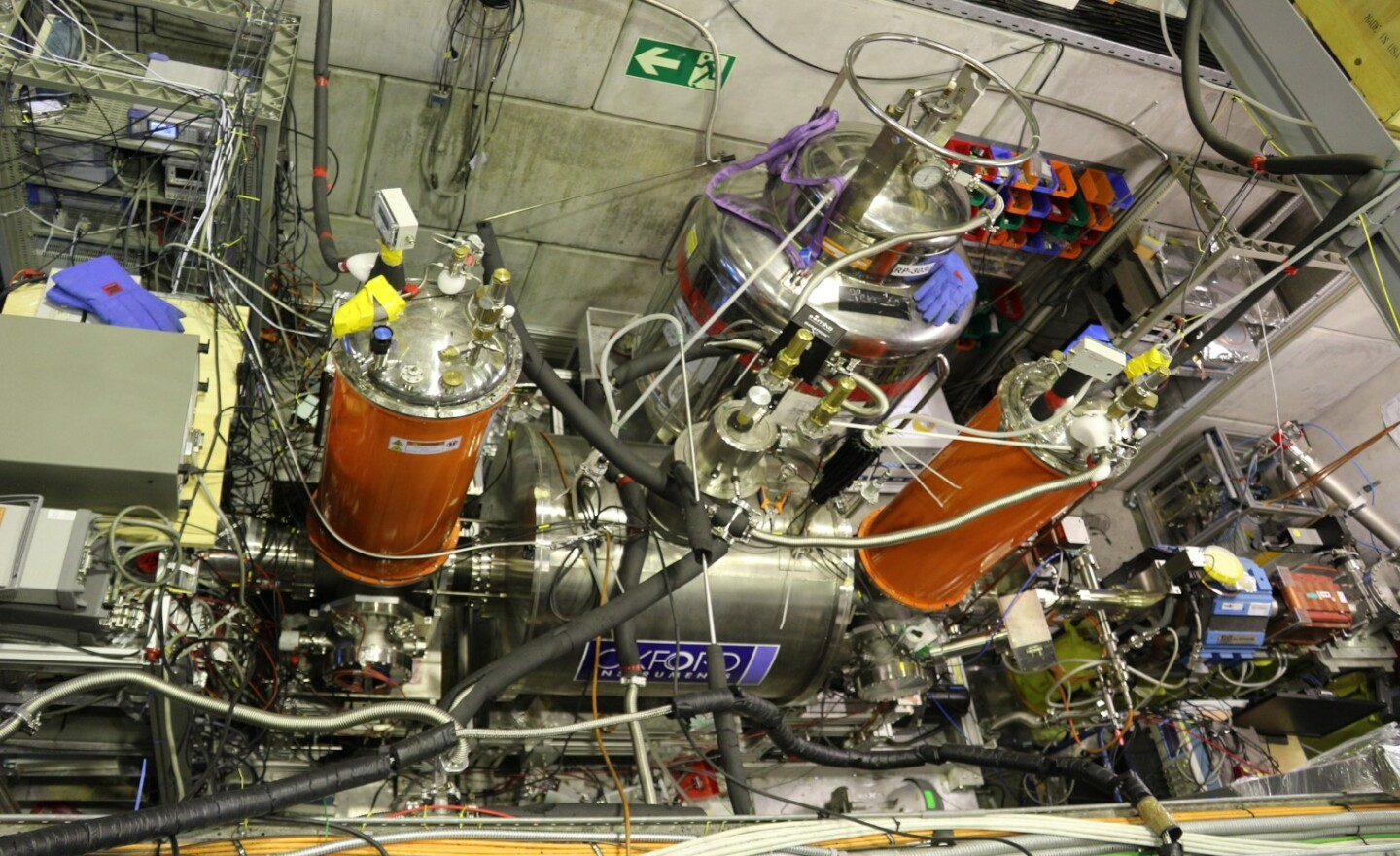
Views of the BASE experimental zone

The BASE collaboration comprises the following institutions:

- RIKEN, Japan
- University of Tokyo, Japan
- Max Planck Institute for Nuclear Physics, Germany
- University of Mainz, Germany
- GSI, Germany
- Leibniz University Hannover, Germany
- PTB, Braunschweig, Germany
- ETH Zürich, Switzerland

== See also ==
- Antiproton Decelerator
- TRAP experiment
- ATRAP experiment
