= Jeffrey Hangst =

Experimental particle physicist

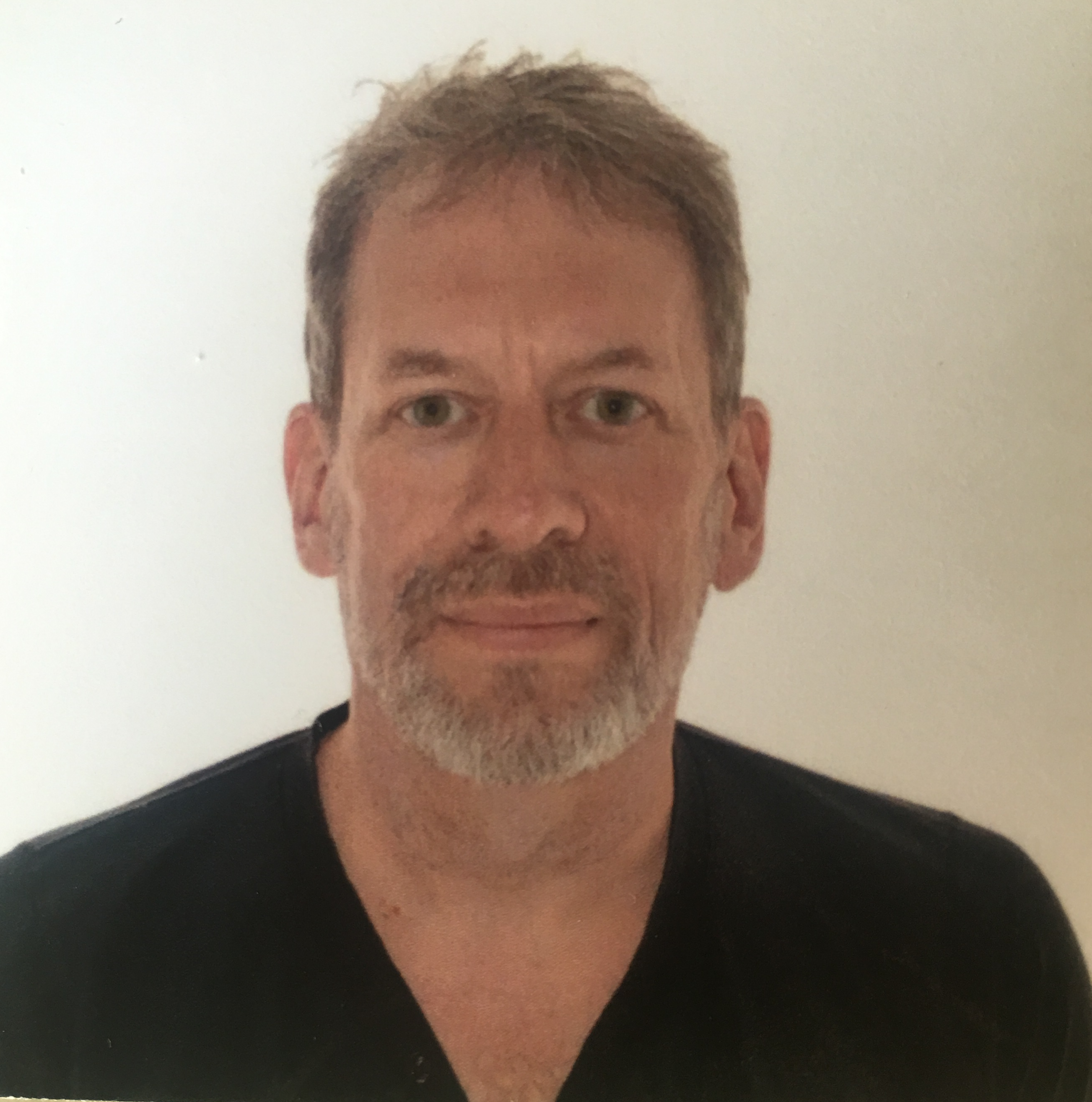
Jeffrey Scott Hangst

Jeffrey Scott Hangst is an experimental particle physicist at Aarhus University, Denmark, and founder and spokesperson of the ALPHA collaboration at the Antiproton Decelerator (AD) at CERN, Geneva. He was also one of the founding members and the Physics Coordinator of the ATHENA collaboration at the AD facility.

He obtained his bachelor’s in physics and master’s in nuclear science engineering in 1980 from the Massachusetts Institute of Technology, followed by a Ph.D. in physics from the University of Chicago in 1992.

== Research ==
Hangst’s research area focuses on the production, trapping and spectroscopic and gravitational studies of antihydrogen. He is one of the world’s leading researchers in the domain of antimatter physics. In 2002, the ATHENA collaboration was the first to synthesize antihydrogen from trapped plasmas of antiprotons and positrons. In 2010, the ALPHA collaboration demonstrated the first trapping of antihydrogen atoms, opening the door to the first spectroscopic measurements of anti-atomic matter. These two are the breakthroughs in Hangst’s and his ALPHA team’s research domain.

== Awards and recognition ==
Hangst has received the following awards and recognition for his research works in physics.

1. European Physical Society's 1996 accelerator award for a young scientist for his work on laser cooling of stored ion beams in the ASTRID storage ring in Aarhus.
2. He was elected to fellowship of the American Physical Society, Division of Plasma Physics in 2005.
3. Recipient of the John Dawson Award for Excellence in Plasma Physics Research, 2011, for the introduction and use of innovative plasma techniques that produced and demonstrated the trapping of antihydrogen.
4. Received the Angstrom medal from the Uppsala University in 2013 for his work on trapped antihydrogen.
5. Member of the Royal Danish Academy of Sciences and Letters.
