= Gravitational interaction of antimatter =

Theory of gravity on antimatter

The gravitational interaction of antimatter with matter or antimatter has been observed by physicists. As was predicted by most physicists, the experiment showed that Earth's gravity attracts antimatter at the same rate as matter, within experimental error.

Antimatter's rarity and tendency to annihilate when brought into contact with matter makes its study a technically demanding task. Furthermore, gravity is much weaker than the other fundamental forces, for reasons still of interest to physicists, complicating efforts to study gravity in systems small enough to be feasibly created in lab, including antimatter systems. Most methods for the creation of antimatter (specifically antihydrogen) result in particles and atoms of high kinetic energy, which are unsuitable for gravity-related study.

Antimatter is gravitationally attracted to matter. The magnitude of the gravitational force is also the same. This is predicted by theoretical arguments like the gravitational equivalence of energy and matter, and has been experimentally verified for antihydrogen. However, the measured equivalence of the gravitational acceleration of matter to matter vs antimatter to matter has an error margin of about 20%. Difficulties in creating quantum gravity models have led to the idea that antimatter may react with a slightly different magnitude.

== Theories of gravitational attraction ==
When antimatter was first discovered in 1932, physicists wondered how it would react to gravity. Initial analysis focused on whether antimatter should react the same as matter or react oppositely. Several theoretical arguments arose which convinced physicists that antimatter would react the same as normal matter. They inferred that gravitational repulsion between matter and antimatter was implausible as it would violate CPT invariance, conservation of energy, result in vacuum instability, and result in CP violation. It was also theorized that it would be inconsistent with the results of the Eötvös test of the weak equivalence principle. Many of these early theoretical objections were later overturned.

=== The equivalence principle ===
The equivalence principle predicts that mass and energy react the same way with gravity, therefore matter and antimatter would be accelerated identically by a gravitational field. From this point of view, matter-antimatter gravitational repulsion is unlikely.

=== Photon behavior ===
Photons, which are their own antiparticles in the framework of the Standard Model, have in a large number of astronomical tests (gravitational redshift and gravitational lensing, for example) been observed to interact with the gravitational field of ordinary matter exactly as predicted by the general theory of relativity. This is a feature that any theory that predicts that matter and antimatter repel must explain.

=== CPT theorem ===
The CPT theorem implies that the difference between the properties of a matter particle and those of its antimatter counterpart is completely described by C-inversion. Since this C-inversion does not affect gravitational mass, the CPT theorem predicts that the gravitational mass of antimatter is the same as that of ordinary matter. A repulsive gravity is then excluded, since that would imply a difference in sign between the observable gravitational mass of matter and antimatter.

=== Morrison's argument ===
In 1958, Philip Morrison argued that antigravity would violate conservation of energy. If matter and antimatter responded oppositely to a gravitational field, then it would take no energy to change the height of a particle–antiparticle pair. However, when moving through a gravitational potential, the frequency and energy of light is shifted. Morrison argued that energy would be created by producing matter and antimatter at one height and then annihilating it higher up, since the photons used in production would have less energy than the photons yielded from annihilation.

=== Schiff's argument ===
Later in 1958, L. Schiff used quantum field theory to argue that antigravity would be inconsistent with the results of the Eötvös experiment. However, the renormalization technique used in Schiff's analysis is heavily criticized, and his work is seen as inconclusive. In 2014 the argument was redone by Marcoen Cabbolet, who concluded however that it merely demonstrates the incompatibility of the Standard Model and gravitational repulsion.

=== Good's argument ===
In 1961, Myron L. Good argued that antigravity would result in the observation of an unacceptably high amount of CP violation in the anomalous regeneration of kaons. At the time, CP violation had not yet been observed. However, Good's argument is criticized for being expressed in terms of absolute potentials. By rephrasing the argument in terms of relative potentials, Gabriel Chardin found that it resulted in an amount of kaon regeneration which agrees with observation. He argued that antigravity is a potential explanation for CP violation based on his models on K mesons. His results date to 1992. Since then however, studies on CP violation mechanisms in the B mesons systems have fundamentally invalidated these explanations.

=== Gerard 't Hooft's argument ===
According to Gerard 't Hooft, every physicist recognizes immediately what is wrong with the idea of gravitational repulsion: if a ball is thrown high up in the air so that it falls back, then its motion is symmetric under time-reversal; and therefore, the ball falls also down in opposite time-direction. Since a matter particle in opposite time-direction is an antiparticle, this proves according to 't Hooft that antimatter falls down on earth just like "normal" matter. However, Cabbolet replied that 't Hooft's argument is false, and only proves that an anti-ball falls down on an anti-earth – which is not disputed by most theories on matter-antimatter gravitational repulsion. Still, 't Hooft's argument can be used against the Dirac-Milne theory where antimatter gravitationally repels both matter and antimatter..

== Theories of gravitational repulsion ==
Since repulsive gravity has not been refuted experimentally, it is possible to speculate about physical principles that would bring about such a repulsion. Thus far, three radically different theories have been published.

=== Kowitt's theory ===
The first theory of repulsive gravity was a quantum theory published by Mark Kowitt. In this modified Dirac theory, Kowitt postulated that the positron is not a hole in the sea of electrons-with-negative-energy as in usual Dirac hole theory, but instead is a hole in the sea of electrons-with-negative-energy-and-positive-gravitational-mass: this yields a modified C-inversion, by which the positron has positive energy but negative gravitational mass. Repulsive gravity is then described by adding extra terms (m_{g}Φ_{g} and m_{g}A_{g}) to the wave equation. The idea is that the wave function of a positron moving in the gravitational field of a matter particle evolves such that in time it becomes more probable to find the positron further away from the matter particle.

=== Santilli and Villata's theory ===
Classical theories of repulsive gravity have been published by Ruggero Santilli and Massimo Villata. Both theories are extensions of general relativity, and are experimentally indistinguishable. The general idea remains that gravity is the deflection of a continuous particle trajectory due to the curvature of spacetime, but antiparticles 'live' in an inverted spacetime. The equation of motion for antiparticles is then obtained from the equation of motion of ordinary particles by applying the C, P, and T operators (Villata) or by applying isodual maps (Santilli), which amounts to the same thing: the equation of motion for antiparticles then predicts a repulsion of matter and antimatter. It has to be taken that the observed trajectories of antiparticles are projections on our spacetime of the true trajectories in the inverted spacetime. However, it has been argued on methodological and ontological grounds that the area of application of Villata's theory cannot be extended to include the microcosmos. These objections were subsequently dismissed by Villata.

=== Cabbolet's theory ===
The first non-classical, non-quantum physical principles underlying a matter–antimatter gravitational repulsion have been published by Marcoen Cabbolet. He introduces the Elementary Process Theory, which uses a new language for physics, i.e. a new mathematical formalism and new physical concepts, and which is incompatible with both quantum mechanics and general relativity. The core idea is that nonzero rest mass particles such as electrons, protons, neutrons and their antimatter counterparts exhibit stepwise motion as they alternate between a particlelike state of rest and a wavelike state of motion. Gravitation then takes place in a wavelike state, and the theory allows, for example, that the wavelike states of protons and antiprotons interact differently with the earth's gravitational field.

=== Analysis ===
Further authors have used a matter–antimatter gravitational repulsion to explain cosmological observations, but these publications do not address the physical principles of gravitational repulsion.

== Experiments ==
=== Supernova 1987A ===
One source of experimental evidence in favor of normal gravity was the observation of neutrinos from Supernova 1987A. In 1987, three neutrino detectors around the world simultaneously observed a cascade of neutrinos emanating from a supernova in the Large Magellanic Cloud. Although the supernova happened about 164,000 light years away, both neutrinos and antineutrinos seem to have been detected virtually simultaneously. If both were actually observed, then any difference in the gravitational interaction would have to be very small. However, neutrino detectors cannot distinguish perfectly between neutrinos and antineutrinos. Some physicists conservatively estimate that there is less than a 10% chance that no regular neutrinos were observed at all. Others estimate even lower probabilities, some as low as 1%. Unfortunately, this accuracy is unlikely to be improved by duplicating the experiment any time soon. The last known supernova to occur at such a close range prior to Supernova 1987A was around 1867.

=== Cold neutral antihydrogen experiments ===
Since 2010 the production of cold antihydrogen has become possible at the Antiproton Decelerator at CERN. Antihydrogen, which is electrically neutral, should make it possible to directly measure the gravitational attraction of antimatter particles to the matter of Earth.

Antihydrogen atoms have been trapped at CERN, first ALPHA and then ATRAP; in 2012 ALPHA used such atoms to set the first free-fall loose bounds on the gravitational interaction of antimatter with matter, measured to within ±7500% of ordinary gravity, not enough for a clear scientific statement about the sign of gravity acting on antimatter. Future experiments need to be performed with higher precision, either with beams of antihydrogen (AEgIS) or with trapped antihydrogen (ALPHA or GBAR).

In 2013, experiments on antihydrogen atoms released from the ALPHA trap set direct, i.e. freefall, coarse limits on antimatter gravity. These limits were coarse, with a relative precision of ±100%, thus, far from a clear statement even for the sign of gravity acting on antimatter. Future experiments at CERN with beams of antihydrogen, such as AEgIS, or with trapped antihydrogen, such as ALPHA and GBAR, have to improve the sensitivity to make a clear, scientific statement about gravity on antimatter.

In 2023 ALPHA achieved the first result that proved that antimatter has the same sign for gravitational free fall acceleration as regular matter.

== See also ==
- Fifth force
- Dark energy
- Dark matter
