= ASACUSA experiment =

Experiment at the Antiproton Decelerator

Antiproton decelerator (AD)
- ELENA: Extra low energy antiproton ring – further decelerates antiprotons coming from AD

AD experiments
- ATHENA: AD-1 Antihydrogen production and precision experiments
- ATRAP: AD-2 Cold antihydrogen for precise laser spectroscopy
- ASACUSA: AD-3 Atomic spectroscopy and collisions with antiprotons
- ACE: AD-4 Antiproton cell experiment
- ALPHA: AD-5 Antihydrogen laser physics apparatus
- AEgIS: AD-6 Antihydrogen experiment gravity interferometry spectroscopy
- GBAR: AD-7 Gravitational behaviour of anti-hydrogen at rest
- BASE: AD-8 Baryon antibaryon symmetry experiment
- PUMA: AD-9 Antiproton unstable matter annihilation

Atomic Spectroscopy and Collisions Using Slow Antiprotons (ASACUSA), AD-3, is an experiment at the Antiproton Decelerator (AD) at CERN. The experiment was proposed in 1997, started collecting data in 2002 by using the antiprotons beams from the AD, and will continue in future under the AD and ELENA decelerator facility.

== ASACUSA physics ==
ASACUSA collaboration is testing for CPT-symmetry by laser spectroscopy of antiprotonic helium and microwave spectroscopy of the hyperfine structure of antihydrogen. It compares matter and antimatter using antihydrogen and antiprotonic helium and looks into matter-antimatter collisions. It also measures atomic and nuclear cross-sections of antiprotons on various targets at extremely low energies.

In 2020 ASACUSA in collaboration with the Paul Scherrer Institut (PSI) reported spectral measurements of long lived pionic helium.

In 2022 ASACUSA reported spectral measurements of antiprotonic helium suspended in gaseous and liquid (He-I and He-II) targets. An abrupt narrowing of spectral lines was discovered at temperatures near the superfluid phase transition temperature. The narrowness and symmetry of the spectral lines for antiprotonic helium contrasts with other types of atoms suspended in He-I and He-II. This is hypothesized to be related to the order of magnitude smaller orbital radius of $\sim$40 pm which is comparably unaffected during laser excitation.

== Experimental setup ==
=== Antiproton Trap ===
ASACUSA receives antiproton beams from the AD and ELENA decelerator. These beams are decelerated to 0.01 MeV energy using a radiofrequency decelerator and the antiprotons are stored in the MUSASHI traps. The positrons to form antihydrogen atoms are obtained from $\ce{Na^{22}}$ radioactive source and stored in a positron accumulator. The mixing of antiprotons and positrons forms polarised and cold antihydrogen inside a double-Cusp trap. The polarised antihydrogen atoms from this system then enter the spectrometer where the measurements are done.

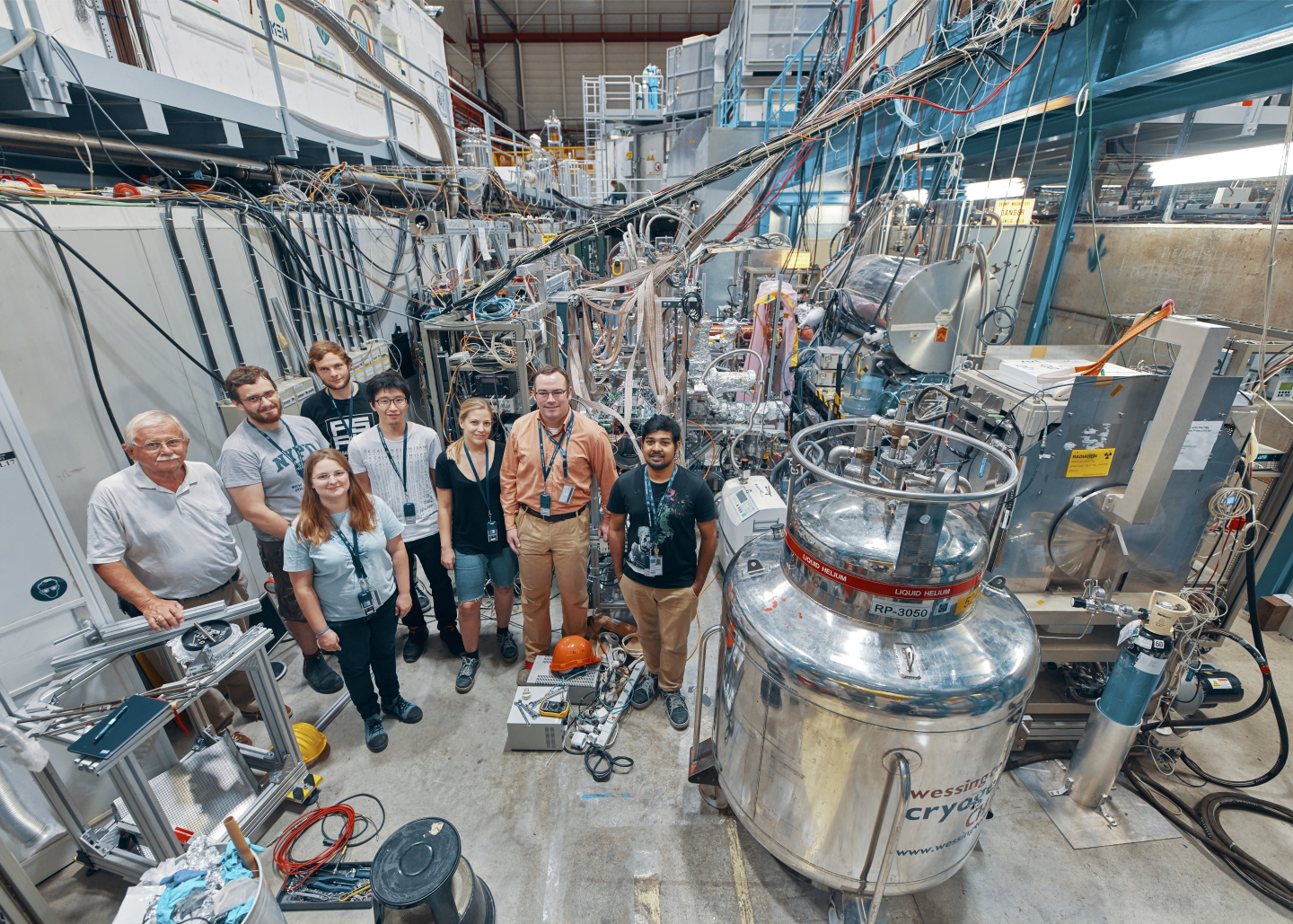
ASACUSA team at beam setup preparation in September 2018

=== Beam Spectroscopy ===
Hyperfine spectroscopy measurements on H beams in flight have been made using a Rabi experiment. The collaboration plans to conduct similar measurements on H̅ in flight.

=== Cryogenic Target Spectroscopy ===
==== Electrostatic Beamline ====
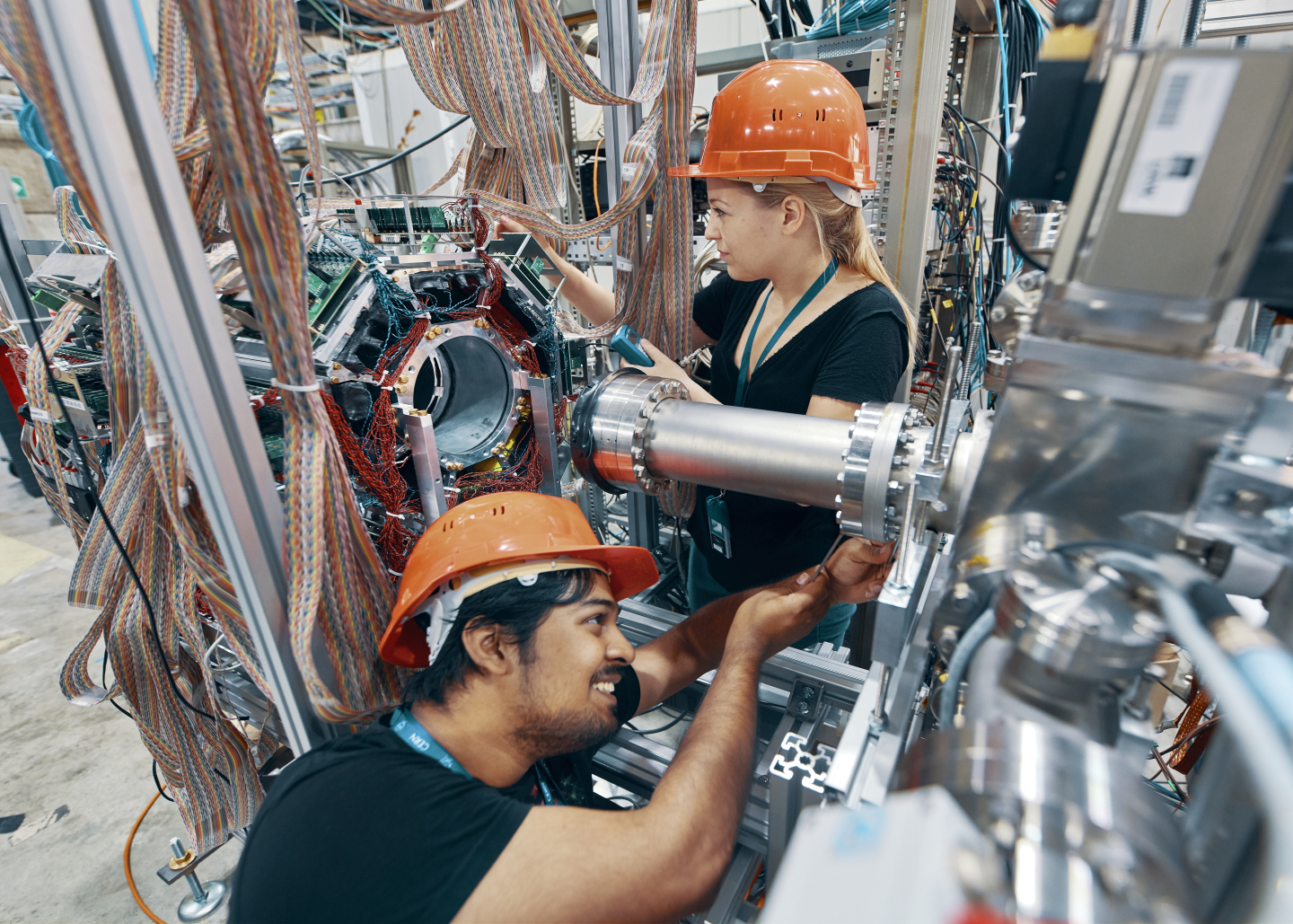
ASACUSA team preparing beam setup for the ELENA beams in September 2018.

Anticipating completion of ELENA, with the aim of making spectral measurements of previously undetected atomic resonances in antiprotonic helium, a new 6 m electrostatic beamline was constructed to transport p̅s to a cryogenic target. (Previous experiments, including the antiprotonic helium spectral measurements of March 2022 used a 3 m Radio-frequency Quadrupole to decelerate p̅s from the Antiproton Decelerator.) 0.1 MeV ELENA p̅s entering the beamline are focussed to a width of $\le$1 mm and pass through an aperture (30 mm length and 8 mm diameter). The transverse horizontal and vertical dimensions of the beam are determined by beam monitors consisting of a grid of gold-coated tungsten-rhenium wires with grid spacing of 20 μm. (There are 3 such monitors along the beamline, one of which is $\le$ 300 mm upstream of the cryogenic chamber.) Further along the beamline, there is a configuration of 3 quadrupole magnets to counteract p̅ beam expansion and 2 more apertures of diameters 30 mm and 16 mm. A beam emerging from the apertures is focussed to 3 mm diameter and impinges on a 6 mm diameter titanium window in an OFHC copper flange mounted on the cryogenic target chamber wall. Acrylic and lead fluoride Čerenkov detectors monitor the beamline for p̅ annihilations. The beamline pressure is 0.8 mb, much higher than the ELENA beamline pressure of $\sim10^{-9}$ mb. The pressure difference is maintained by three 500 L/s titanium ion and 4 turbomolecular pumps.

==== Cryogenic Chamber ====
The helium targets are contained in a 35 mm diameter vessel made of titanium (gaseous or supercritical phase with 70% He-I) or OFHC copper (He-I and He-II) mounted on a liquid helium constant-flow cryostat. The vessel is enclosed within copper thermal shielding: an inner shield cooled by coolant helium vapour and an outer shield cooled by liquid nitrogen. A configuration of manometers and temperature sensors provide data used to characterize the state of the helium in the chamber. Pressures $\ge$ 1 MPa can be sustained. The chamber is accessible to antiprotons through an annealed titanium window of diameter 75 μm or 50 μm vacuum brazed into the chamber wall. Opposite this, a 28-mm diameter, 5-mm thick UV-grade sapphire window transmits laser light, antilinear to an incident particle beam. Two 35-mm diameter Brewster windows made of fused silica (SiO_{2}) mounted on flanges on opposite sides of the chamber walls perpendicular to the beam axis transmit laser light. Near the cryostat, beneath the beampipe, is positioned a 300 $\times$ 200 $\times$ 20 mm$^3$ Čerenkov detector. Particles emerging from the cryostat, such as pions from p-p̅ annihilations emit Čerenkov radiation in the detector which is detected by a photomultiplier.

== ASACUSA collaboration ==
- Stefan Meyer Institute for Subatomic Physics, ÖAW, Austria
- Imperial College London, UK
- Experimental Physics Department, CERN, Switzerland
- Ulmer Fundamental Symmetries Laboratory, RIKEN, Japan
- University of Brescia, Italy
- Polytechnic University of Milan, Italy
- Hiroshima University, Japan
- Nishina Center for Accelerator-Based Science, RIKEN, Japan
- University of Tokyo, Japan
- University of Milan, Italy
- Tokyo University of Science, Japan
- Aarhus University, Denmark
- Istituto Nazionale di Fisica Nucleare, Italy
- Max-Planck-Institut für Quantenoptik, Germany

== See also ==
- Antiproton decelerator
- ATRAP experiment
- ALPHA experiment
