= ACE experiment =

Medical research at CERN, Geneva (2003–2013)

Antiproton decelerator (AD)
- ELENA: Extra low energy antiproton ring – further decelerates antiprotons coming from AD

AD experiments
- ATHENA: AD-1 Antihydrogen production and precision experiments
- ATRAP: AD-2 Cold antihydrogen for precise laser spectroscopy
- ASACUSA: AD-3 Atomic spectroscopy and collisions with antiprotons
- ACE: AD-4 Antiproton cell experiment
- ALPHA: AD-5 Antihydrogen laser physics apparatus
- AEgIS: AD-6 Antihydrogen experiment gravity interferometry spectroscopy
- GBAR: AD-7 Gravitational behaviour of anti-hydrogen at rest
- BASE: AD-8 Baryon antibaryon symmetry experiment
- PUMA: AD-9 Antiproton unstable matter annihilation

The Antiproton Cell Experiment (ACE), AD-4, at the Antiproton Decelerator facility at CERN, Geneva, was started in 2003. It aims to assess fully the effectiveness and suitability of antiprotons for cancer therapy.

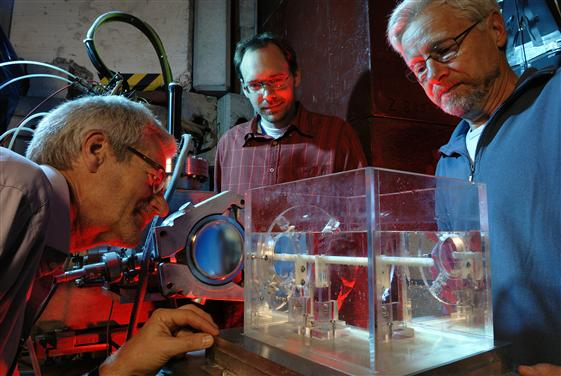
Members of ACE collaboration at experimental setup

In 1947, Robert R. Wilson introduced particle beam therapy, as heavy charged particles tend to have a finite range in water (therefore, in the human body) and an advantageous depth-dose profile compared to that of electrons or X-rays. Following such ideas, the hunt for an 'ideal' particle for cancer therapy began. And ACE collaboration was set up to measure and compare the relative biological effectiveness of protons and antiprotons.

The results from ACE experiment showed that antiprotons required to break down the tumor cells were four times less than the number of protons required. The effect on healthy tissues due to antiprotons was significantly less. Although the experiment ended in 2013, further research and validation still continue, owing to the long procedures of bringing in novel medical treatments.

== See also ==
- Antiproton Decelerator
