= Michael Holzscheiter =

German-born professor at the University of New Mexico

Michael Holzscheiter is a German-born professor at the University of New Mexico.

Holzscheiter received his PhD from the University of Mainz in 1978. He has conducted numerous experiments with low energy antiprotons at CERN for over 30 years.

After initial work on antiprotons traps he initiated the ATHENA collaboration on forming antihydrogen for precision studies of CPT symmetry. Then he turned his interest to medical physics and led the AD-4/ACE (Antiproton Cell Experiment) collaboration on biological effects of antiprotons from 2003 to 2013.
