= AEgIS experiment =

Experiment at the Antiproton Decelerator

Antiproton decelerator (AD)
- ELENA: Extra low energy antiproton ring – further decelerates antiprotons coming from AD

AD experiments
- ATHENA: AD-1 Antihydrogen production and precision experiments
- ATRAP: AD-2 Cold antihydrogen for precise laser spectroscopy
- ASACUSA: AD-3 Atomic spectroscopy and collisions with antiprotons
- ACE: AD-4 Antiproton cell experiment
- ALPHA: AD-5 Antihydrogen laser physics apparatus
- AEgIS: AD-6 Antihydrogen experiment gravity interferometry spectroscopy
- GBAR: AD-7 Gravitational behaviour of anti-hydrogen at rest
- BASE: AD-8 Baryon antibaryon symmetry experiment
- PUMA: AD-9 Antiproton unstable matter annihilation

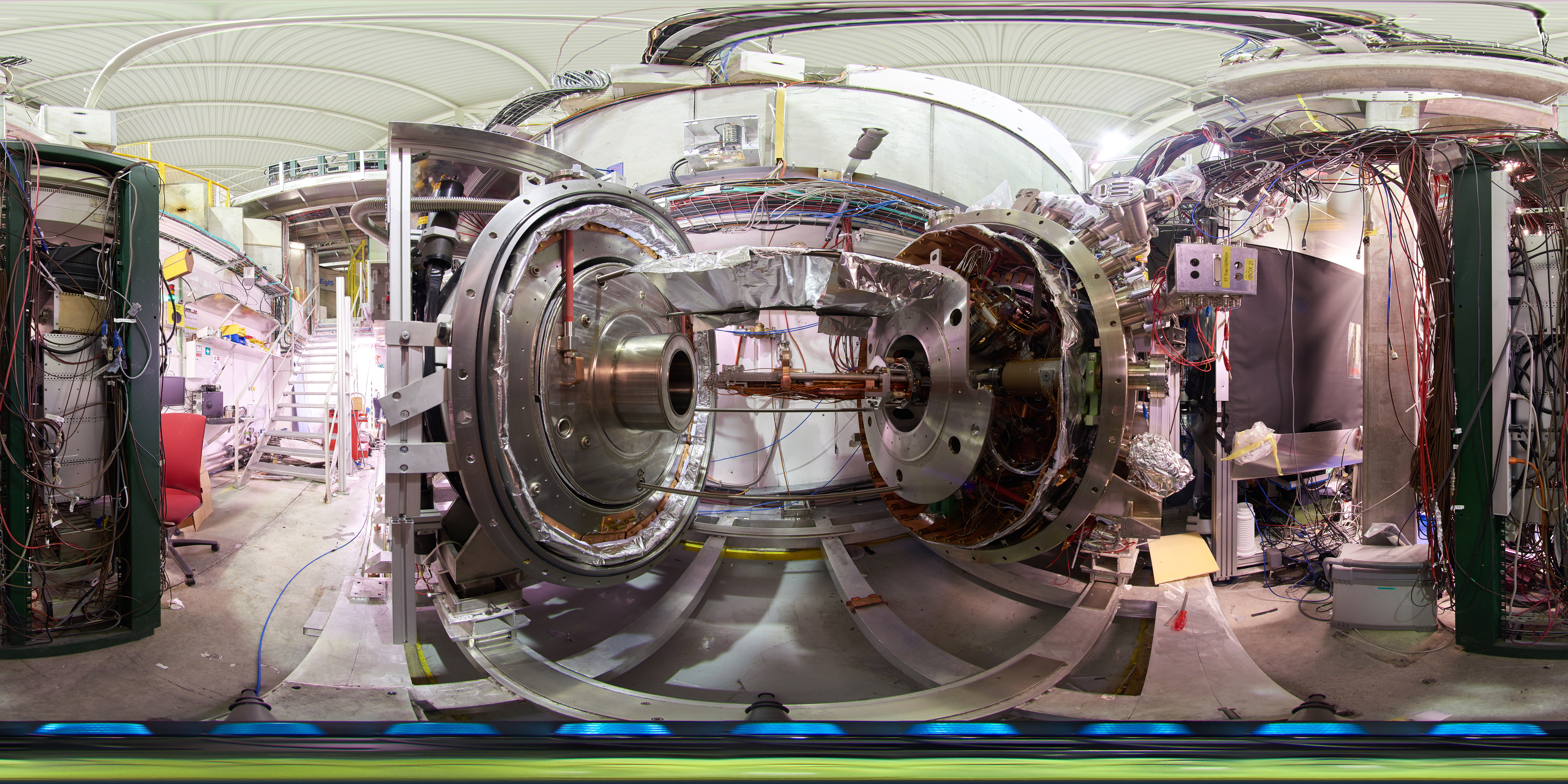
360 degrees view of the AEgIS experimental zone.

AEgIS (Antimatter Experiment: gravity, Interferometry, Spectroscopy), AD-6, is an experiment at the Antiproton Decelerator facility at CERN. Its primary goal is to measure directly the effect of Earth's gravitational field on antihydrogen atoms with significant precision. Indirect bounds that assume the validity of, for example, the universality of free fall, the Weak Equivalence Principle or CPT symmetry also in the case of antimatter constrain an anomalous gravitational behavior to a level where only precision measurements can provide answers. Vice versa, antimatter experiments with sufficient precision are essential to validate these fundamental assumptions. AEgIS was originally proposed in 2007. Construction of the main apparatus was completed in 2012. Since 2014, two laser systems with tunable wavelengths (few picometer precision) and synchronized to the nanosecond for specific atomic excitation have been successfully commissioned.

In 2024, AEgIS achieved the first demonstration of laser cooling of a gas composed of positronium atoms. In April 2025, AEgIS announced a new antimatter detector made from modified smartphone cameras. This detector achieved the highest pixel count of any imaging detector to date.

== AEgIS experimental setup and physics ==
Simplified model of an antihydrogen atom in ground state

AEgIS will attempt to determine if gravity affects antimatter in the same way it affects normal matter by testing its effect on an antihydrogen beam. The aspired experimental setup uses the moiré deflectometer to measure the vertical displacement of a beam of cold antihydrogen atoms traveling in Earth's gravitational field.

In the first phase of the experiment (running until 2018), antiprotons from the Antiproton Decelerator (AD) with a kinetic energy of 5.3MeV had to pass through a series of aluminum foils which acted as so-called degraders, slowing down a fraction of the fast antiprotons to few keV. The slow antiprotons were then further cooled by merging them with extra cold trapped electrons (electron cooling) and finally trapped inside a Malmberg–Penning trap. An intense radioactive β^{+} source (^{22}Na) was used to produce positrons, which were accumulated in a Surko-type storage trap at low pressure (3e-8 mbar). These positrons were implanted into a nano-structured porous silicon target in order to efficiently form positronium (Ps) - even at cryogenic temperatures in Ultra-high vacuum (UHV). A cloud of positronium emerging from the target was then excited to a Rydberg level of n=16/17 by using laser-induced two-step optical transitions. Inside the Malmberg–Penning trap, the charge exchange reaction between cold antiprotons and Rydberg-Ps took place, leading to the formation of Rydberg-antihydrogen with high efficiency in the form of a 4π pulse.

$\mathrm{Ps^* + \bar p \longrightarrow \bar{H^*} + e^-}$ (Charge exchange reaction)

In the second phase of the AEGIS experiment, starting from 2021 after AEgIS has been successfully connected to the new antiproton deceleration and storage ring ELENA, the Rydberg antihydrogen atoms will be channeled into a beam. In an arrangement known as a moiré deflectometer, the beam will then pass through a series of matter gratings before striking an imaging detector. Antihydrogen atoms that come in contact with a grating will annihilate upon doing so; those that pass the gratings will form a diffraction pattern captured by the imaging detector at which they too will annihilate.

At each grating and at the final imaging detector, a structure of plastic scintillators and set of silicon photomultipliers are installed, to detect the approximate quantity of ionizing radiation produced by annihilation at each grating and at the final imaging detector. This set of detectors is called Scintillator Assemblies to Reveal Annihilations, or SARA.

The annihilation locations at the imaging detector reproduce a periodic pattern of light and shadowed areas. This pattern is highly sensitive to small vertical displacements of the anti-atoms during their horizontal flight - the Earth's gravitational force on antihydrogen can thus be determined with high precision, initially aiming at 1%.

== AEgIS collaboration ==
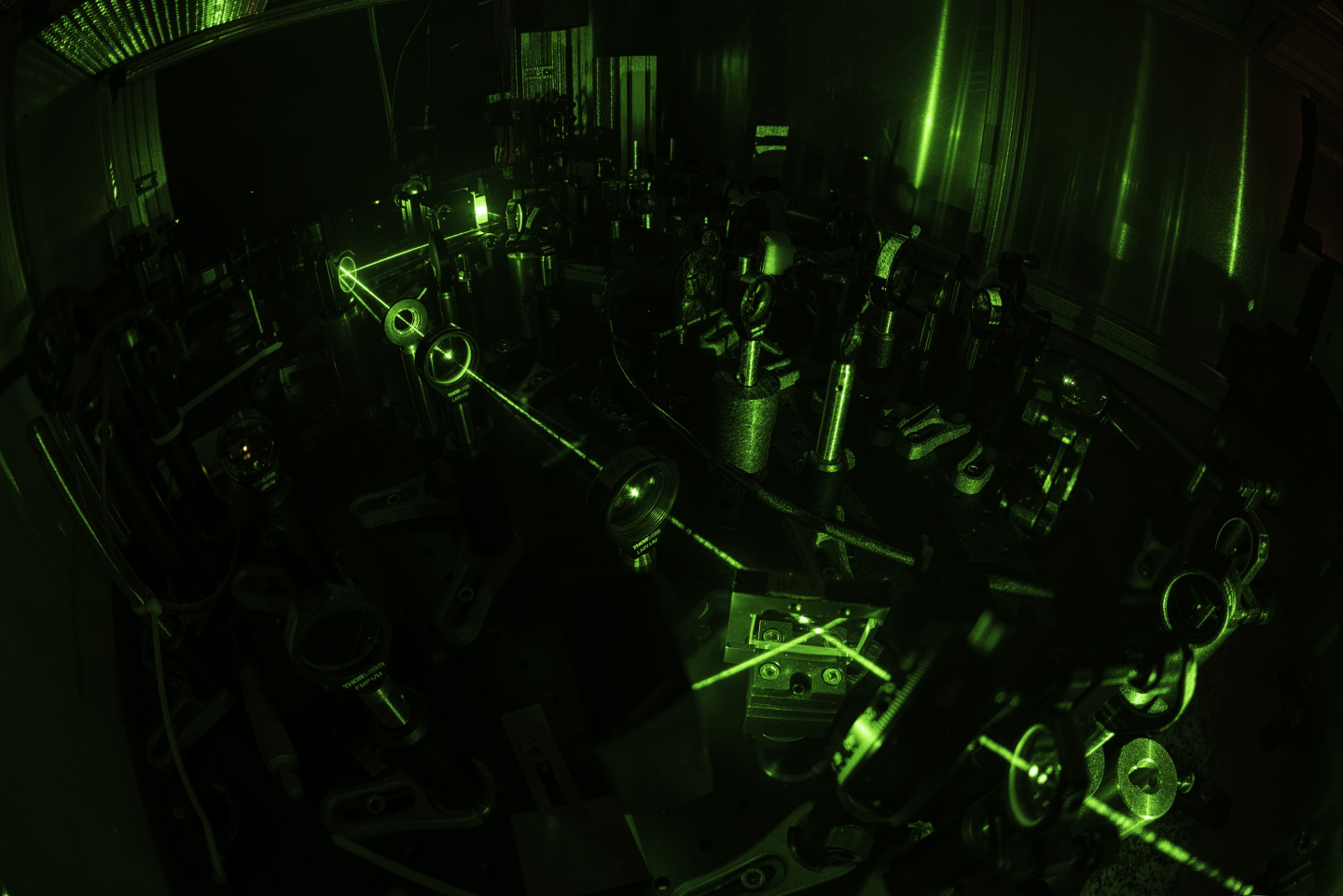
Laser experimental setup at AEgIS

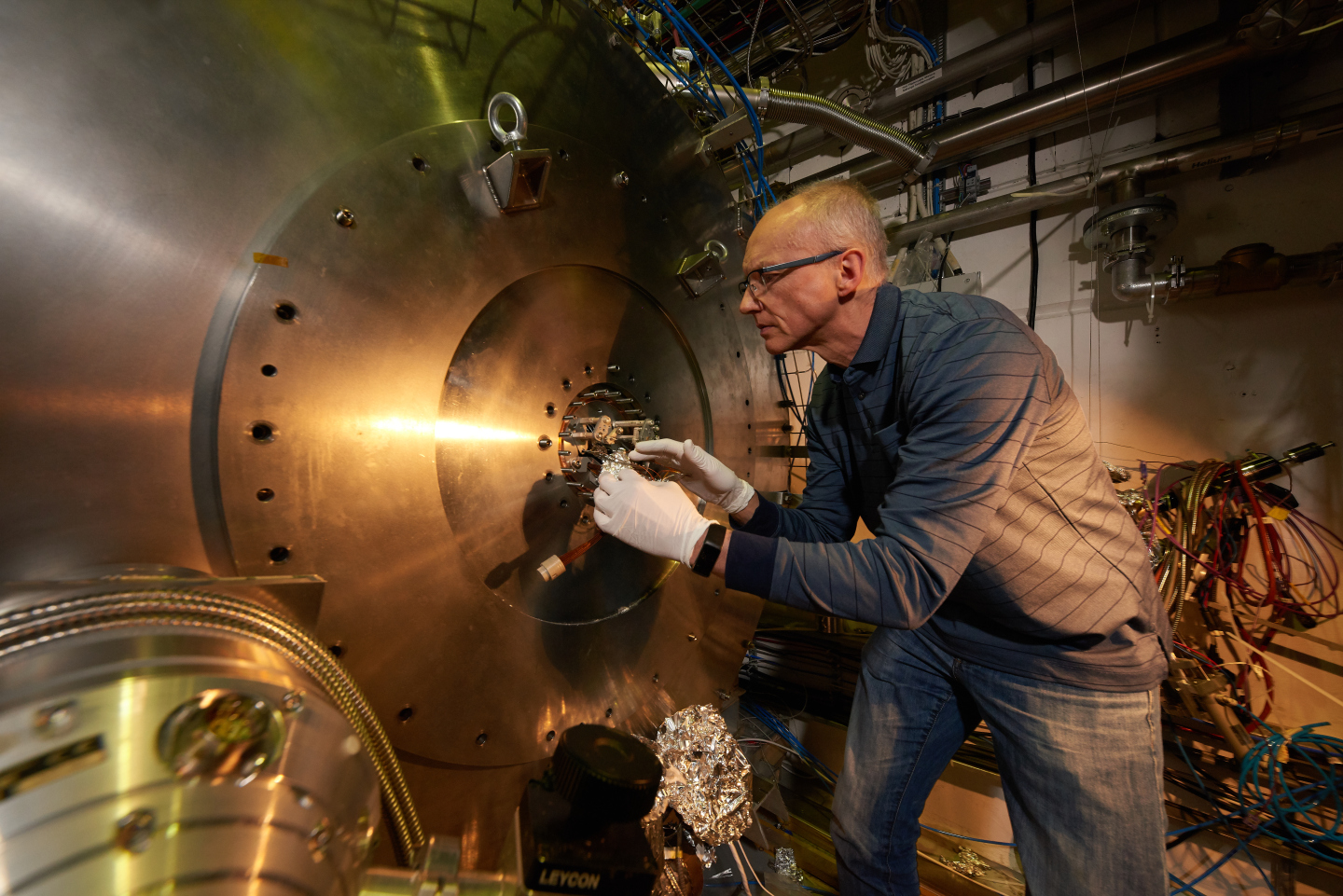
AEgIS technical coordinator Stefan Haider in front of the main apparatus. The part removed is amongst colleagues called the "Sun" as it has several instruments sticking out from the central circular flange.

The AEgIS collaboration comprises the following institutions:

- University of Bergen, Norway
- Warsaw University of Technology, Poland
- Raman Research Institute, India
- Institute of Physics, Polish Academy of Sciences, Poland
- Nicolaus Copernicus University in Toruń, Poland
- INFN, Italy
- University of Liverpool, United Kingdom
- University of Oslo, Norway
- Czech Technical University in Prague, Czech Republic
- Université de Lyon, France
- University of Latvia, Latvia
- University of Trento, Italy
- Politecnico Milano, Italy
- CERN, CERN

== See also ==
1. Antiproton Decelerator
2. GBAR experiment
3. ALPHA experiment
