= PUMA experiment =

Particle physics experiment at CERN

Antiproton decelerator (AD)
- ELENA: Extra low energy antiproton ring – further decelerates antiprotons coming from AD

AD experiments
- ATHENA: AD-1 Antihydrogen production and precision experiments
- ATRAP: AD-2 Cold antihydrogen for precise laser spectroscopy
- ASACUSA: AD-3 Atomic spectroscopy and collisions with antiprotons
- ACE: AD-4 Antiproton cell experiment
- ALPHA: AD-5 Antihydrogen laser physics apparatus
- AEgIS: AD-6 Antihydrogen experiment gravity interferometry spectroscopy
- GBAR: AD-7 Gravitational behaviour of anti-hydrogen at rest
- BASE: AD-8 Baryon antibaryon symmetry experiment
- PUMA: AD-9 Antiproton unstable matter annihilation

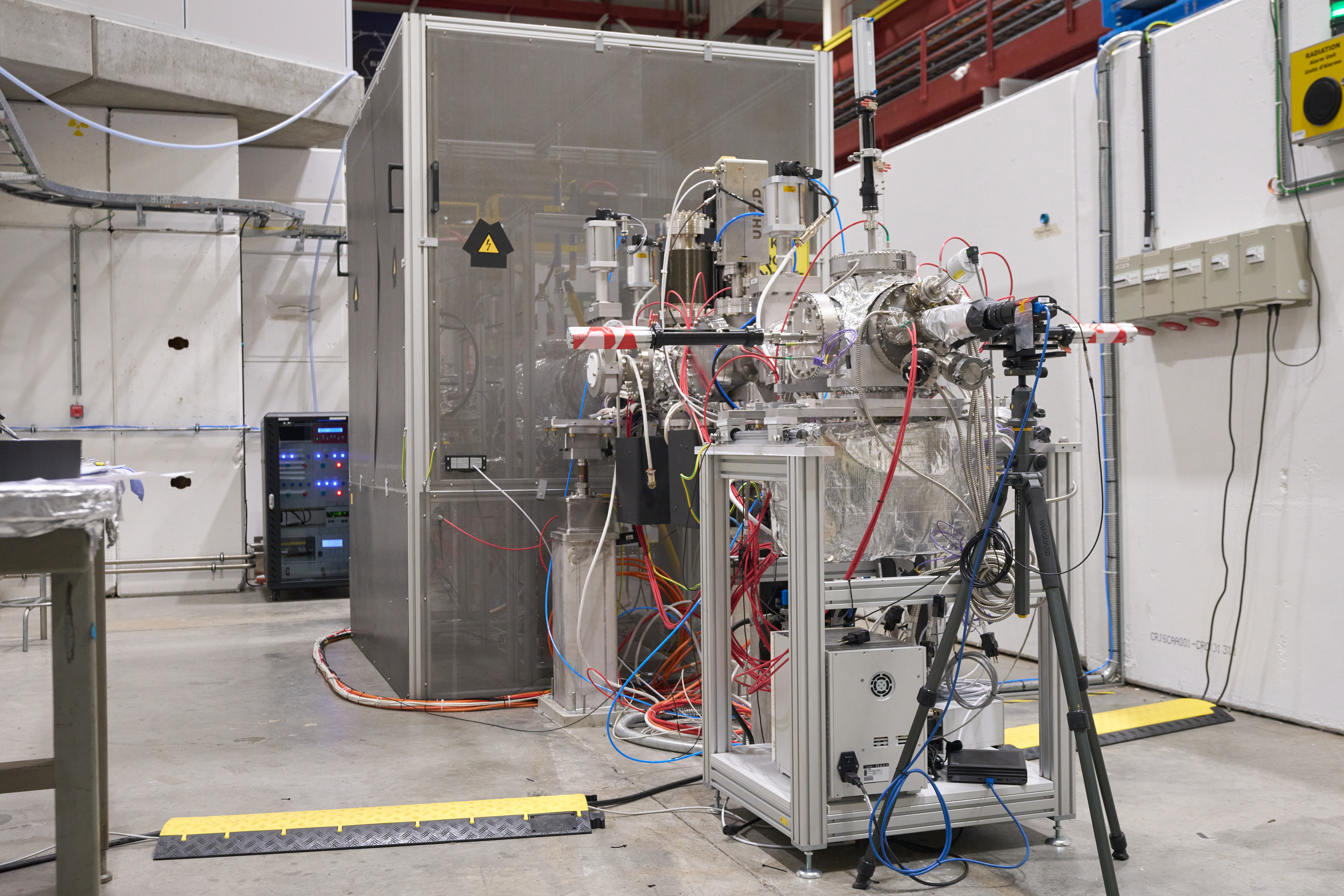
First elements of the PUMA experiment installed in the AD facility at CERN

The PUMA (antiProton Unstable Matter Annihilation) AD-9 experiment, at the Antiproton decelerator (AD) facility at CERN, Geneva, aims to look into the quantum interactions and annihilation processes between the antiprotons and the exotic slow-moving nuclei. PUMA's experimental goals require about one billion trapped antiprotons made by AD and ELENA to be transported to the ISOLDE-nuclear physics facility at CERN, which will supply the exotic nuclei. Antimatter has never been transported out of the AD facility before. Designing and building a trap for this transportation is the most challenging aspect for the PUMA collaboration.

== Physics goals ==
The main goal of the PUMA experiment is to study the neutron and proton densities at the annihilation sites in the unstable nuclei. These sites are formed at the tail of the nuclear densities and can be probed with low-energy antiprotons. Such experiments by the PUMA collaboration will study the evolution of neutron skins with isospin, and study the proton and neutron halos in exotic nuclei at the ISOLDE facility. The idea was first proposed by Wada and Yamazaki in 2001. And now PUMA experiment will be the unique facility using antiprotons as probes for unstable nuclei.

== See also ==
- Antiproton decelerator
- ISOLDE
