= GBAR experiment =

Experiment at the Antiproton Decelerator

Antiproton decelerator (AD)
- ELENA: Extra low energy antiproton ring – further decelerates antiprotons coming from AD

AD experiments
- ATHENA: AD-1 Antihydrogen production and precision experiments
- ATRAP: AD-2 Cold antihydrogen for precise laser spectroscopy
- ASACUSA: AD-3 Atomic spectroscopy and collisions with antiprotons
- ACE: AD-4 Antiproton cell experiment
- ALPHA: AD-5 Antihydrogen laser physics apparatus
- AEgIS: AD-6 Antihydrogen experiment gravity interferometry spectroscopy
- GBAR: AD-7 Gravitational behaviour of anti-hydrogen at rest
- BASE: AD-8 Baryon antibaryon symmetry experiment
- PUMA: AD-9 Antiproton unstable matter annihilation

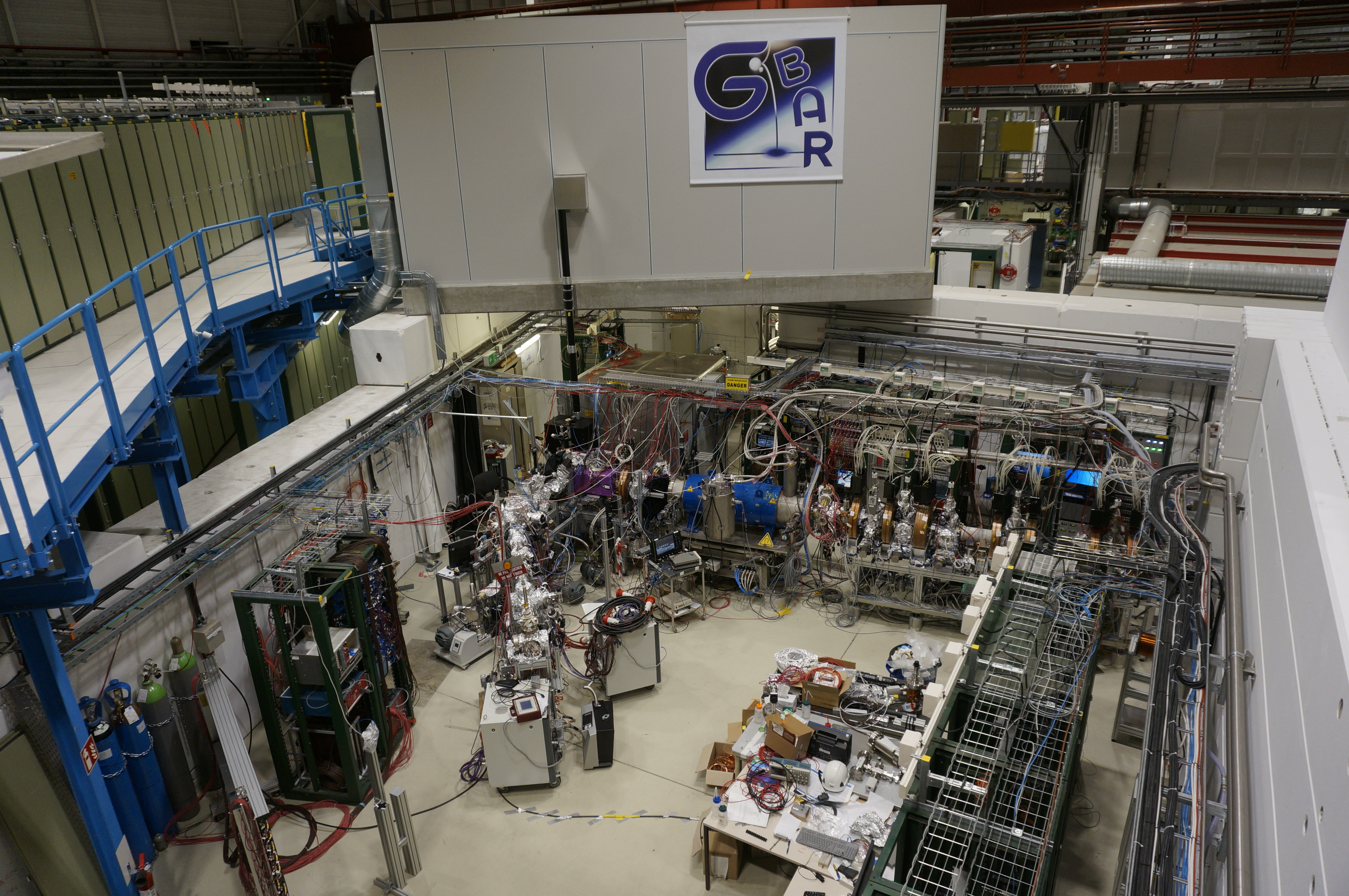
CERN Antimatter factory – GBAR (Gravitational Behaviour of Anti hydrogen at Rest) experiment

GBAR (Gravitational Behaviour of Anti hydrogen at Rest), AD-7 experiment, is a multinational collaboration at the Antiproton Decelerator of CERN.

The GBAR project aims to measure the free-fall acceleration of ultra-cold neutral anti-hydrogen atoms in the terrestrial gravitational field. By measuring the free fall acceleration of anti-hydrogen and comparing it with acceleration of normal hydrogen, GBAR is testing the equivalence principle proposed by Albert Einstein. The equivalence principle says that the gravitational force on a particle is independent of its internal structure and composition.

== Experimental setup ==
The experiment consists of preparing anti-hydrogen ions (Hbar+positronium- one antiproton and two positrons) and sympathetically cooling them with Be+ ions to less than 10 μK. The ultra-cold ions are then photoionized just above the threshold using a laser pulse; this removes the outermost positron and forms neutral anti-hydrogen. The free-fall time of these atoms over a known distance is then measured. This experimental technique is based on the idea proposed by T. Hansch and J. Walz.

Along with antiprotons from AD, GBAR also needs a constant flux of positrons. For this, a small accelerator with a tungsten target is used. An electron beam of 10MeV strikes this target, and positrons are collected by using a magnetic separator to filter out electrons and the gamma-ray background. These positrons are then trapped in Penning–Malmberg traps and cooled down.

Using a neutral particle for GBAR experiment is necessary in order to avoid any kind of electromagnetic interference. In theory, the electrically neutral antineutrons would be the smallest chunks for this experiment, but they cannot be used to due their quick decay time. The next simplest particle is therefore the antihydrogen.

== GBAR collaboration ==
The GBAR collaboration comprises the following institutions:

- CEA, France
- ETH Zurich, Switzerland
- University of Mainz, Germany
- Kastler–Brossel Laboratory, France
- CSNSM, Paris-Saclay University, France
- RIKEN, Japan
- University of Tokyo, Japan
- University of Strasbourg, France
- Uppsala University, Sweden
- Stockholm University, Sweden
- Swansea University, UK
- National Centre for Nuclear Research, Poland

== See also ==
1. Antiproton Decelerator
2. AEgIS experiment
