= TRAP experiment =

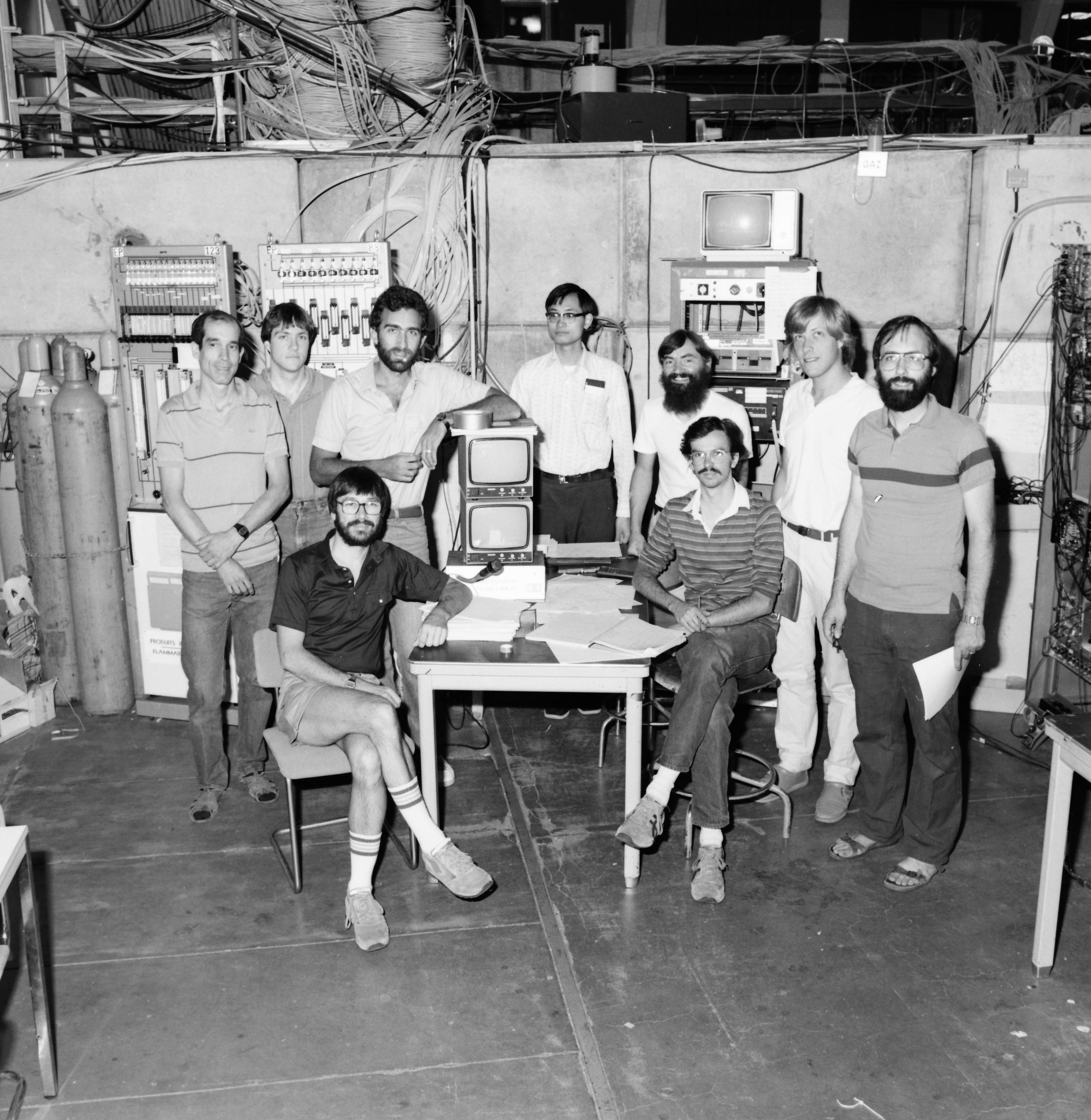
Members of TRAP collaboration in the experimental area

The TRAP experiment, also known as PS196, operated at the Proton Synchrotron facility of the Low Energy Antiproton Ring (LEAR) at CERN, Geneva, from 1985 to 1996. Its main goal was to compare the mass of an antiproton and a proton by trapping these particles in the penning traps. The TRAP collaboration also measured and compared the charge-to-mass ratios of antiproton and proton. Although the data-taking period ended in 1996, the analysis of datasets continued until 2006.

== Experimental setup ==
Antimatter facilities
Low Energy Antiproton Ring (1982–1996)
- Antiproton Accumulator: Antiproton production
- Antiproton Collector: Decelerated and stored antiprotons

Antimatter Factory (2000–present)
- Antiproton Decelerator (AD): Decelerates antiprotons
- Extra Low Energy Antiproton ring (ELENA): Decelerates antiprotons received from AD

In the first step, the antiprotons obtained from the LEAR entered the TRAP apparatus. They were immediately slowed down using the degrader foils. The first penning trap was used to the accumulate the entering antiprotons. While the second trap, located very close to the first one was used for the precision measurements. The number of antiprotons entering the degrader foils were counted using a scintillating device. A number of antiprotons coming out from the degrader foils were observed using an attached detector. The apparatus was cooled down to the liquid helium temperature for these measurements.

The penning traps used strong magnetic fields to contain charged particles. The issue with storing antiprotons was that they required very stringent vacuum conditions, otherwise they would easily interact with the gas atoms in the medium and annihilate quickly. The TRAP collaboration achieved vacuum pressure as low as 10^{−14} Torr, with less than 1 annihilation per day. The special type of trap-geometry and use of superconducting solenoid that would cancel the magnetic fluctuations were the crucial design aspects of the TRAP setup.

== Results ==
The ratio of inertial masses of antiproton (p̅) and proton (p) was calculated to be 0.999,999,977 ± 0.000000042. This result had a fractional uncertainty of 4 × 10^{−8}, which was 1000 thousand times more accurate than the previous measurements, that evidently implied the existence of CPT symmetry for the baryons. This result was obtained by comparing the cyclotron frequencies of the protons and the antiprotons.

The ratio of antiproton to electron inertial mass was determined to be 1836.152660 ± 0.000083, while the proton to electron inertial mass ratio was found to be 1836.152680 ± 0.000088.

The lower limit on the decay lifetime of the antiprotons was established to be 3.4 months.

== See also ==
- ATRAP experiment
- List of Proton Synchrotron experiments
