= ALPHA experiment =

Antimatter gravitation experiment

Antiproton decelerator (AD)
- ELENA: Extra low energy antiproton ring – further decelerates antiprotons coming from AD

AD experiments
- ATHENA: AD-1 Antihydrogen production and precision experiments
- ATRAP: AD-2 Cold antihydrogen for precise laser spectroscopy
- ASACUSA: AD-3 Atomic spectroscopy and collisions with antiprotons
- ACE: AD-4 Antiproton cell experiment
- ALPHA: AD-5 Antihydrogen laser physics apparatus
- AEgIS: AD-6 Antihydrogen experiment gravity interferometry spectroscopy
- GBAR: AD-7 Gravitational behaviour of anti-hydrogen at rest
- BASE: AD-8 Baryon antibaryon symmetry experiment
- PUMA: AD-9 Antiproton unstable matter annihilation

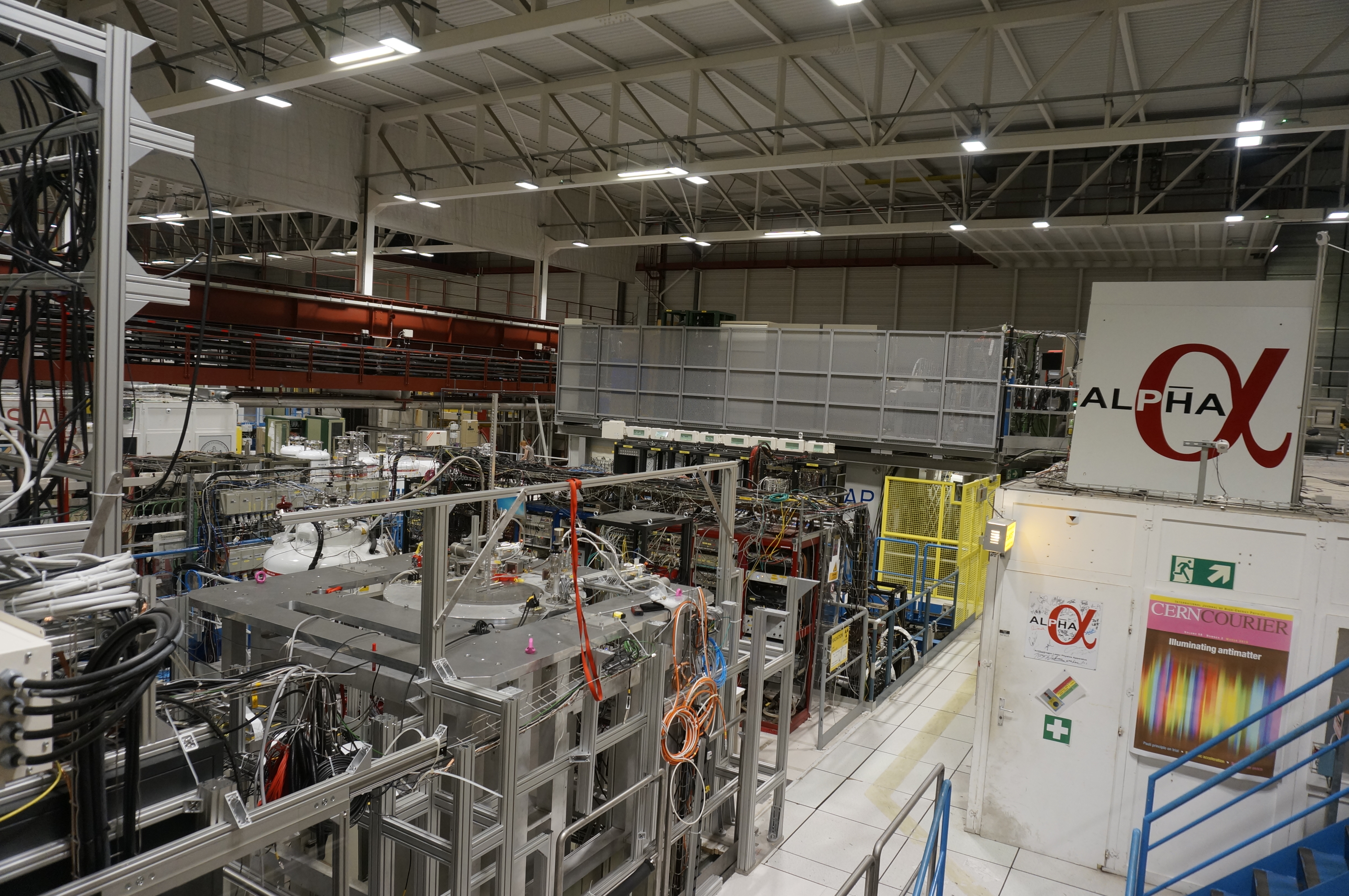
ALPHA experiment

The Antihydrogen Laser Physics Apparatus (ALPHA), also known as AD-5, is an experiment at CERN's Antiproton Decelerator, designed to trap antihydrogen in a magnetic trap in order to study its atomic spectra. The ultimate goal of the experiment is to test CPT symmetry through comparing the respective spectra of hydrogen and antihydrogen. Scientists taking part in ALPHA include former members of the ATHENA experiment (AD-1), the first to produce cold antihydrogen in 2002.

On 27 September 2023, ALPHA collaborators published findings suggesting that antimatter interacts with gravity in a way similar to regular matter, supporting a prediction of the weak equivalence principle.

== Experimental setup ==
Working with antimatter presents several experimental challenges. Magnetic traps—wherein neutral atoms are trapped using their magnetic moments—are required to keep antimatter from annihilating with matter, but are notoriously weak. Only atoms with kinetic energies equivalent to less than one kelvin may be trapped. The ATHENA and ATRAP (AD-2) projects produced antihydrogen by merging cold plasmas of positrons and antiprotons. While this method has been quite successful, it creates antimatter atoms with kinetic energies too large to be trapped. Moreover, to do laser spectroscopy on these antimatter atoms, they need to be in their ground state, something that does not appear to be the case for the majority of antimatter atoms created with this technique.

Antiprotons are received from the antiproton decelerator and are 'mixed' with positrons from a specially designed positron accumulator in a versatile Penning trap. The central region where the mixing and thus antihydrogen formation takes place is surrounded by a superconducting octupole magnet and two axially separated short solenoid "mirror-coils" to form a "minimum-B" magnetic trap. Once trapped, antihydrogen can be subjected to study, and the measurements compared to those of hydrogen.

=== Antihydrogen detection ===
In order to detect trapped antihydrogen, ALPHA also includes a 'silicon vertex detector': a cylindrical detector composed of three layers of silicon strips. Each strip acts as a detector for the charged particles passing through. By recording how the strips are excited, ALPHA can reconstruct the traces of particles traveling through the detector. When an antiproton annihilates, the process typically results in the emission of 3 or 4 charged pions. By reconstructing their traces through the detector, the location of the annihilation can be determined. These traces are quite distinct from those of cosmic rays also detected, but due to their high energy they pass straight through the detector.

To confirm successful trapping, the ALPHA magnet that creates the minimum B-field was designed to allow rapid and repeated de-energizing. The decay of current during de-energization has a characteristic duration of 9 ms, orders of magnitude faster than similar systems. In theory, the fast turn-off speed and the ability to suppress false cosmic rays signals allows ALPHA to detect the release of single antihydrogen atoms during de-energization.

=== Cooling antihydrogen ===
One of the main challenges of working with antihydrogen is cooling it enough to be able to trap it. Antiprotons and positrons are not easily cooled to cryogenic temperatures, so in order to do this ALPHA has implemented a well known technique from atomic physics known as evaporative cooling. State-of-the art minimum-B traps such as the one ALPHA uses have depths of order 1 Kelvin.

== Results ==
A preliminary experiment conducted in 2013 found that the gravitational mass of antihydrogen atoms was between −65 and 110 times their inertial mass, leaving considerable room for refinement using larger numbers of colder antihydrogen atoms.

ALPHA has succeeded in the laser cooling antihydrogen atoms, a technique known as that was first demonstrated on normal matter in 1978.

On 27 September 2023, the ALPHA team published a paper supporting the prediction that the gravitational interaction of antimatter is similar to that of regular matter. For the weak equivalence principle of general relativity to be correct, it is required that the two substances display identical gravitational properties. The findings rule out a 'repulsive [antigravity]', as previously theorized by some in the field.

== Collaborators ==
ALPHA collaborators include the following institutions:

- Aarhus University, Denmark
- University of British Columbia, Canada
- University of California, Berkeley, USA
- University of Calgary, Canada
- University of Liverpool, UK
- University of Manitoba, Canada
- Negev Nuclear Research Center, Israel
- Purdue University, USA
- RIKEN, Japan
- Federal University of Rio de Janeiro, Brazil
- Swansea University, UK
- University of Tokyo, Japan
- York University, Canada
- TRIUMF, Canada
