= Walter Oelert =

German physicist

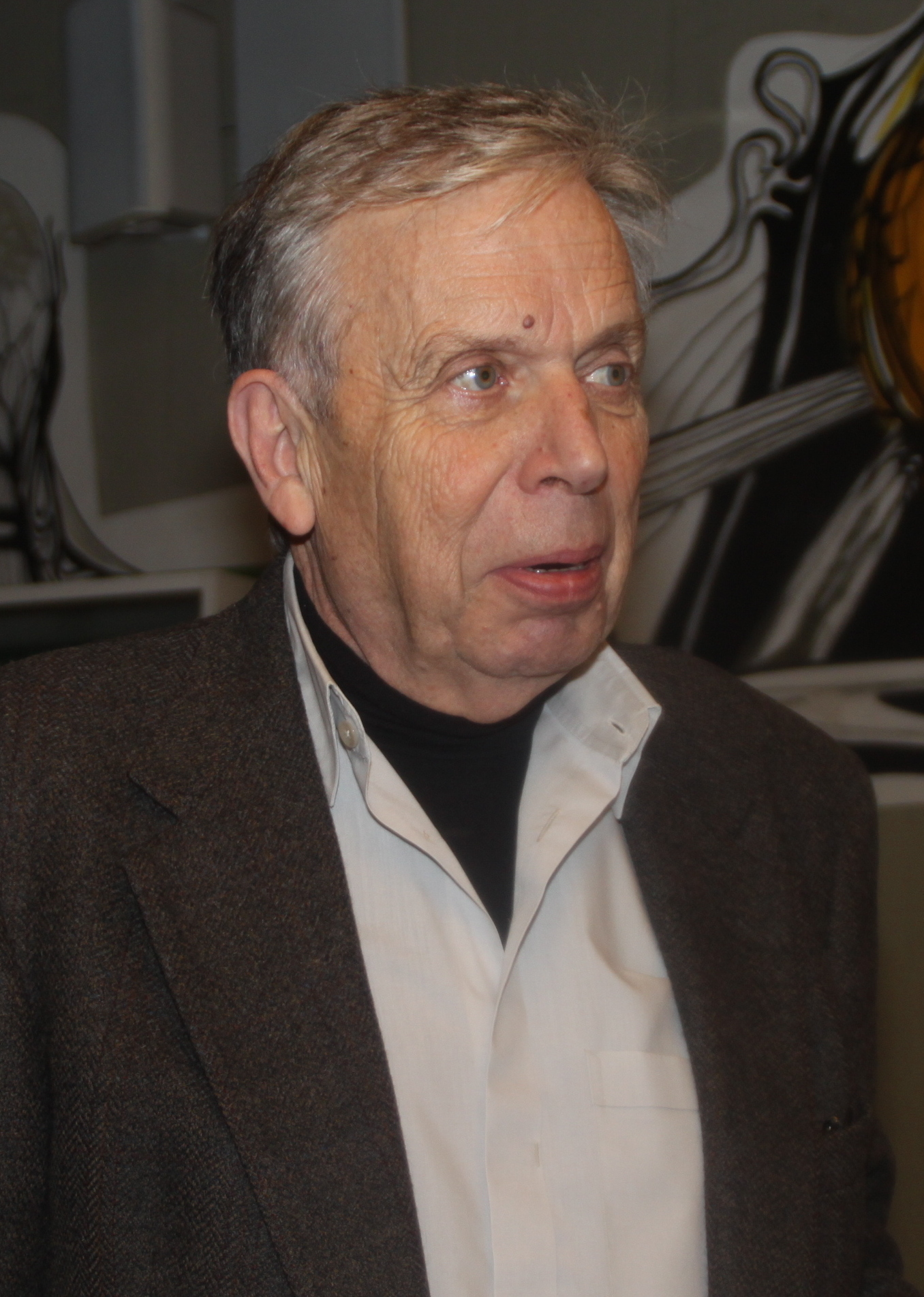
- Born: 14 July 1942
- Died: 25 November 2024 (aged 82)
- Known for: Producing the first antihydrogen atoms
- Scientific career
- Fields: Physics
- Institutions: Research Center Juelich

Walter Oelert (14 July 1942 – 25 November 2024) was a professor at the Juelich Research Center in Germany.

== Research ==
In 1995 under the leadership of Professor Walter Oelert, the international group of physicists in the CERN laboratory managed to show that they had obtained experimentally nine atoms of antihydrogen in a particle accelerator. Later research allowed the CERN scientists to collect anti-protons among low-energy positrons until they combine into anti-atoms and store them at very low temperatures.
