= Extra Low Energy Antiproton ring =

Scientific apparatus at CERN

Antiproton decelerator (AD)
- ELENA: Extra low energy antiproton ring – further decelerates antiprotons coming from AD

AD experiments
- ATHENA: AD-1 Antihydrogen production and precision experiments
- ATRAP: AD-2 Cold antihydrogen for precise laser spectroscopy
- ASACUSA: AD-3 Atomic spectroscopy and collisions with antiprotons
- ACE: AD-4 Antiproton cell experiment
- ALPHA: AD-5 Antihydrogen laser physics apparatus
- AEgIS: AD-6 Antihydrogen experiment gravity interferometry spectroscopy
- GBAR: AD-7 Gravitational behaviour of anti-hydrogen at rest
- BASE: AD-8 Baryon antibaryon symmetry experiment
- PUMA: AD-9 Antiproton unstable matter annihilation

The Extra Low ENergy Antiproton ring (ELENA) is a 30-meter hexagonal storage ring that decelerates antiproton beams and delivers them to different AD experiments. It is situated inside the Antiproton Decelerator (AD) complex at CERN, Geneva, Switzerland. It is designed to further decelerate the antiproton beam coming from the Antiproton Decelerator to an energy of 0.1 MeV for more precise measurements. ELENA's first beam circulated on 18 November 2016. The ring is expected to be fully operational by the end of the Long Shutdown 2 (LS2) in 2021.

The GBAR experiment (AD-7) was the first experiment to use a beam from ELENA, with the rest of the AD experiments following suit after LS2, when beam-transfer lines from ELENA will have been laid to all the experiments using the facility. Long Shutdown 2 (LS2) officially ended on 5 July 2022 with the beginning of LHC Run 3. Antiprotons from ELENA have been available to the MUSASHI trap of the ASACUSA CUSP experiment from August 2021.

== ELENA decelerator ==
The AD and ELENA experiments require antiprotons of about 3 to 5 keV energy, suitable for trapping them in the Penning traps and carrying out further measurements. The AD outputs 5.3 MeV antiprotons, which are then decelerated to ~5 keV using the degrader foils by each of the experimental setups.

This results in a loss of about 99.9% of the antiprotons. The ELENA ring with its efficient beam cooling and deceleration method is meant to increase the effective number of antiprotons that could be made available to the antimatter experiments by reducing the usage of the degrader foils.

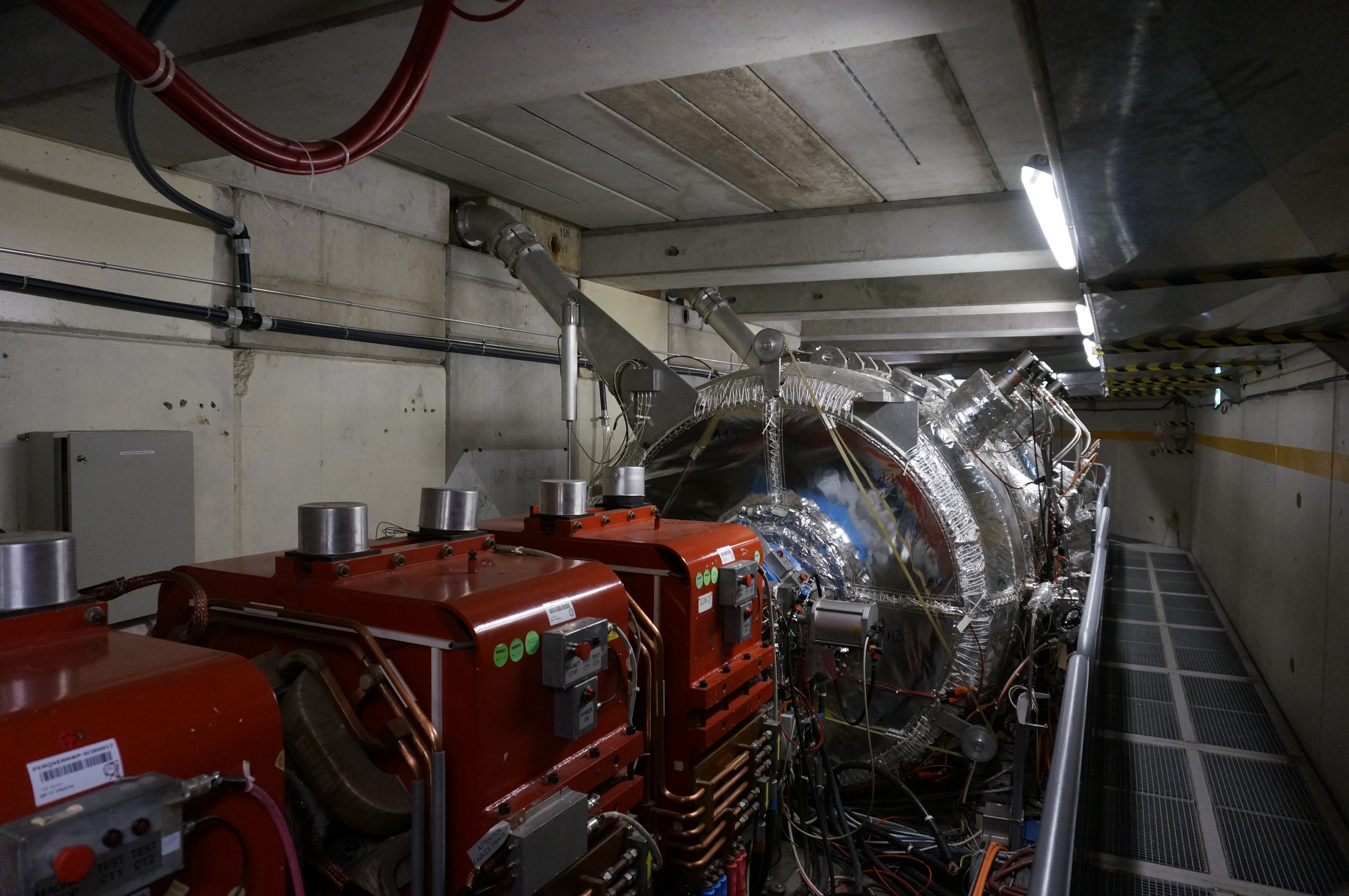
CERN Antimatter Factory – antiproton decelerator

=== Efficiency of ELENA ===
Antimatter facilities
Low Energy Antiproton Ring (1982–1996)
- Antiproton Accumulator: Antiproton production
- Antiproton Collector: Decelerated and stored antiprotons

Antimatter Factory (2000–present)
- Antiproton Decelerator (AD): Decelerates antiprotons
- Extra Low Energy Antiproton ring (ELENA): Decelerates antiprotons received from AD

ELENA will deliver antiprotons at 100 keV energy (compared to AD's 5.3 MeV beam energy). The beam cycle through ELENA ring is ~20 seconds long, while it decelerates antiprotons from 5.3 MeV to 100 keV. These antiprotons still require some further deceleration by the experiments themselves using the degrader foil. But a lesser amount of deceleration through degrading foils would ultimately increase the efficiency. Through ELENA, the ATRAP, ALPHA, and AEgIS experiments will get a two-fold increase in their numbers of antiprotons, while the ASACUSA experiment, which uses radio-frequency quadrupoles and an ultra-degrader foil for deceleration, will receive a ten-fold increase in the number of its antiprotons.

Unlike AD, which can deliver antiprotons to only one experiment at a time, ELENA is capable of delivering them to up to four experiments simultaneously. New experiments such as ReMi (Reaction Microscope) are therefore under proposal.

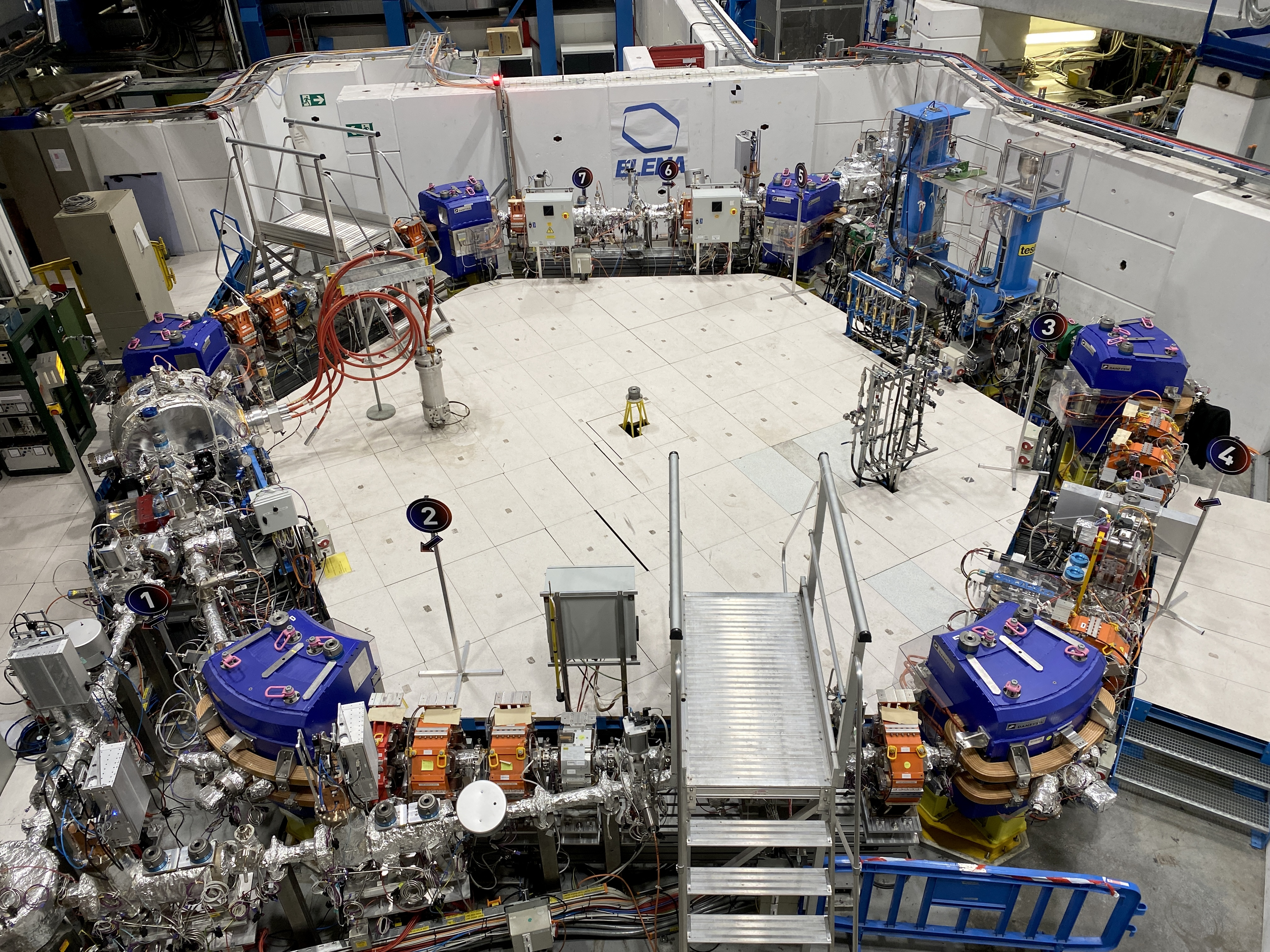
ELENA ring

=== Process of deceleration ===
The first step of deceleration in ELENA uses a radio-frequency cavity and brings down the energy of antiprotons from 5.3 MeV to ~0.65 MeV. During this step the beam is de-bunched, and the electron-cooling method is used to decreases the beam emittance, allowing beam intensity preservation. At the end of this procedure, the 0.65 MeV beam is re-bunched and further decelerated to 0.1 MeV by debunching it and by applying electron cooling.

During the commissioning time period, the AD was actively used by its experiments, so its beams were not regularly available for ELENA's testing. Therefore, an ion source developed at Forschungszentrum Jülich in Germany for producing H^{−} and H^{+} ions was used.

== See also ==
- Antiproton Decelerator
