= ATHENA experiment =

Antimatter research project

Antiproton decelerator (AD)
- ELENA: Extra low energy antiproton ring – further decelerates antiprotons coming from AD

AD experiments
- ATHENA: AD-1 Antihydrogen production and precision experiments
- ATRAP: AD-2 Cold antihydrogen for precise laser spectroscopy
- ASACUSA: AD-3 Atomic spectroscopy and collisions with antiprotons
- ACE: AD-4 Antiproton cell experiment
- ALPHA: AD-5 Antihydrogen laser physics apparatus
- AEgIS: AD-6 Antihydrogen experiment gravity interferometry spectroscopy
- GBAR: AD-7 Gravitational behaviour of anti-hydrogen at rest
- BASE: AD-8 Baryon antibaryon symmetry experiment
- PUMA: AD-9 Antiproton unstable matter annihilation

ATHENA, also known as the AD-1 experiment, was an antimatter research project at the Antiproton Decelerator at CERN, Geneva. In August 2002, it was the first experiment to produce 50,000 low-energy antihydrogen atoms, as reported in Nature. In 2005, ATHENA was disbanded and many of the former members of the research team worked on the subsequent ALPHA experiment and AEgIS experiment.

== Experimental setup ==
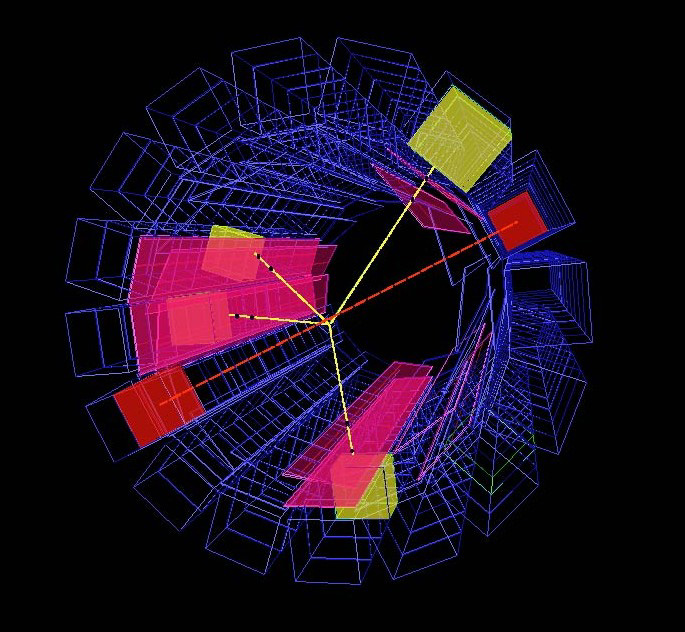
An actual matter-antimatter annihilation due to an atom of antihydrogen in the ATHENA experiment. The antiproton produces four charged pions (yellow) whose positions are given by silicon microstrips (pink) before depositing energy in CsI crystals (yellow cubes). The positron also annihilates to produce back-to-back gamma rays (red).

The ATHENA apparatus comprised four main subsystems: the antiproton catching trap, the positron accumulator, the antiproton/positron mixing trap, and the antihydrogen annihilation detector. All traps in the experiment were variations of the Penning trap, which uses an axial magnetic field to transversely confine the charged particles, and a series of hollow cylindrical electrodes to trap them axially. The catching and mixing traps were adjacent to each other, and coaxial with a 3 T magnetic field from a superconducting solenoid.

The positron accumulator had its own magnetic system, also a solenoid, with a field strength of 0.14 tesla. A separate cryogenic heat exchanger in the bore of the superconducting magnet cooled the catching and mixing traps to about 15 K. The ATHENA apparatus featured an open, modular design that allowed experimental flexibility, particularly in introducing large numbers of positrons into the apparatus.

=== Catching trap ===
The catching trap slowed, trapped, cooled, and accumulated antiprotons. To cool antiprotons, the catching trap was first loaded with 3×10^{8} electrons, which cooled by synchrotron radiation in the 3-tesla magnetic field. Typically, the AD delivered 2×10^{7} antiprotons having kinetic energy 5.3 MeV and a pulse duration of 200 ns to the experiment at 100 s intervals. The antiprotons were slowed in a thin foil and trapped using a pulsed electric field. The antiprotons lost energy and equilibrated with the cold electrons by Coulomb interaction. The electrons were ejected before mixing the antiprotons with positrons. Each AD shot resulted in about 3×10^{3} cold antiprotons for interaction experiments.

=== Positron accumulator ===
The positron accumulator slowed, trapped and accumulated positrons emitted from a radioactive source (1.4×10^{9} Bq ^{22}Na). Accumulation for 300 s yields 1.5×10^{8} positrons, 50% of which were transferred to the mixing trap, where they cooled by synchrotron radiation.

=== Mixing trap ===
The mixing trap had the axial potential configuration of a nested Penning trap, which permitted two plasmas of opposite charge to come into contact. In ATHENA, the spheroidal positron cloud could be characterized by exciting and detecting axial plasma oscillations. Typical conditions were: 7×10^{7} stored positrons, a radius of 2 – 2.5 mm, a length of 32 mm, and a maximum density of 2.5×10^{8} cm^{−3}. An antihydrogen annihilation detector was situated coaxially with the mixing region, between the trap outer radius and the magnet bore.

=== Antihydrogen annihilation detector ===
The detector was designed to provide unambiguous evidence for antihydrogen production by detecting the temporally and spatially coincident annihilations of the antiproton and positron when a neutral antihydrogen atom escaped the electromagnetic trap and struck the trap electrodes. An antiproton typically annihilates into a few charged or neutral pions. The charged pions were detected by two layers of double-sided, position sensitive, silicon microstrips. The path of a charged particle passing through both layers could be reconstructed, and two or more intersecting tracks allowed determination of the position, or vertex, of the antiproton annihilation. The uncertainty in vertex determination was approximately 4 mm and is dominated by the unmeasured curvature of the charged pions' trajectories in the magnetic field. The temporal coincidence window was approximately 5 microseconds. The solid angle coverage of the interaction region was about 80% of 4π.

A positron annihilating with an electron yields two or three photons. The positron detector, comprising 16 rows each containing 12 scintillating, pure cesium-iodide-crystals, was designed to detect the two-photon events, consisting of two 511 keV photons which are always emitted back-to-back. The energy resolution of the detector was 18% full width half maximum at 511 keV, and the photo-peak detection efficiency for single photons was about 20%. The maximum readout rate of the whole detector was about 40 Hz. Ancillary detectors included large scintillator paddles external to the magnet, and a thin, position sensitive, silicon diode through which the incident antiproton beam passed before entering the catching trap.

To produce antihydrogen atoms, a positron well in the mixing region was filled with about 7×10^{7} positrons and allowed to cool to the ambient temperature (15 kelvin). The nested trap was then formed around the positron well. Next, approximately 104 antiprotons were launched into the mixing region by pulsing the trap from one potential configuration to another. The mixing time is 190 s, after which all particles were dumped and the process repeated. Events triggering the imaging silicon detector (three sides hit in the outer layer) initiated readout of both the silicon and the CsI modules.

Using this method, ATHENA could produce – for the first time – several thousands of cold antihydrogen atoms in 2002.

== ATHENA collaboration ==
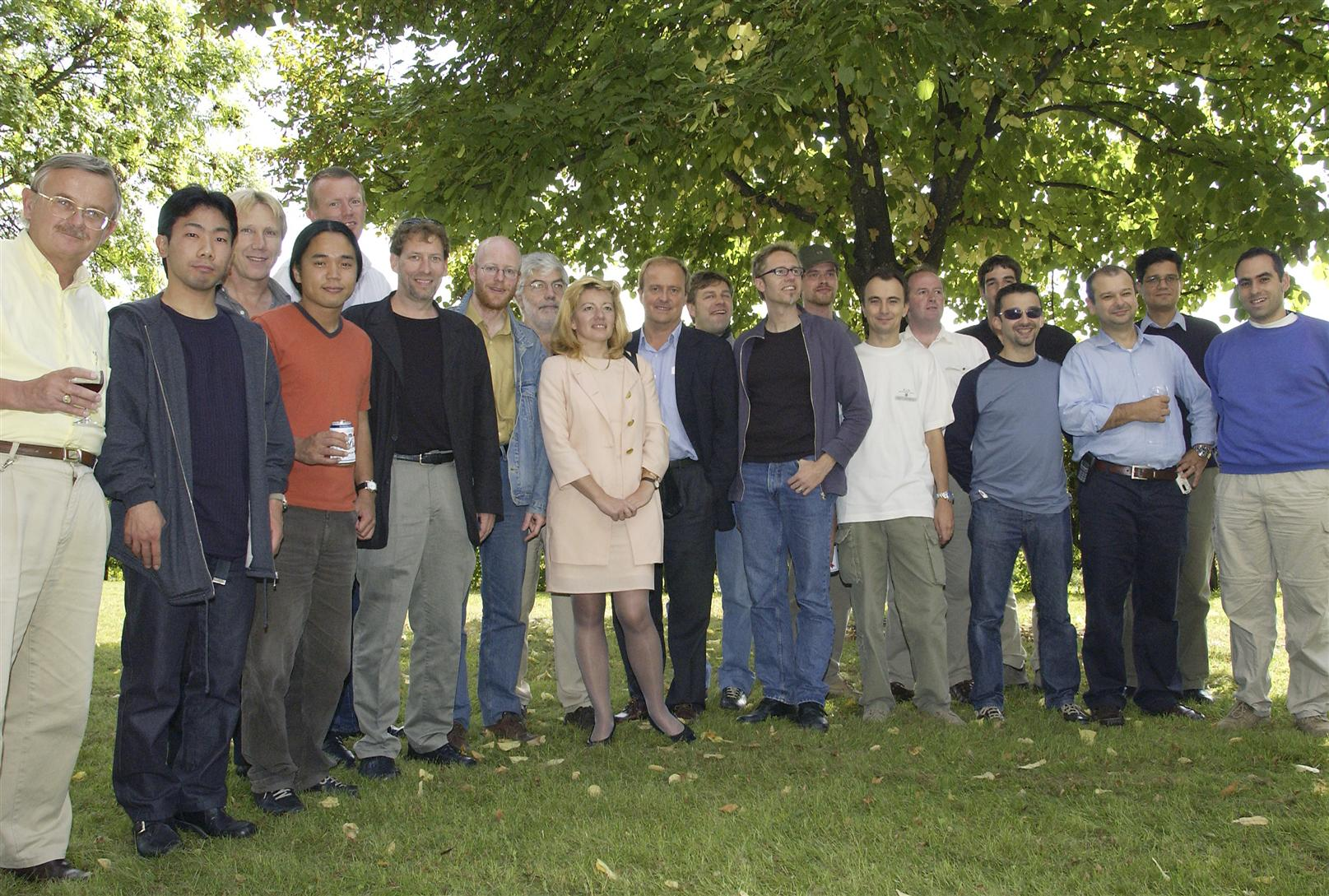
Members of the ATHENA collaboration gathered to celebrate the successful production of thousands of antihydrogen atoms, on 20 September 2002

The ATHENA collaboration comprised the following institutions:

- Aarhus University, Denmark
- University of Brescia, Italy
- CERN
- University of Genoa, Italy
- University of Pavia, Italy
- RIKEN, Japan
- Federal University of Rio de Janeiro, Brazil
- Swansea University, UK
- University of Tokyo, Japan
- University of Zurich, Switzerland
- National Institute for Nuclear Physics, Italy
