= UA8 experiment =

High-energy physics experiment at CERN

Super Proton–Antiproton Synchrotron (Spp̅S)
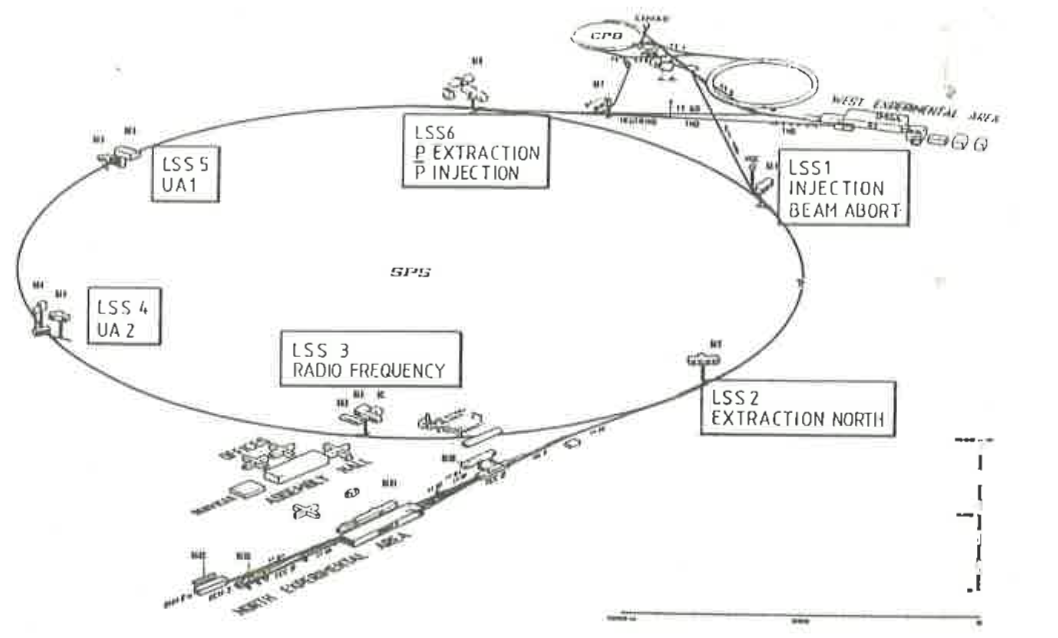

Key Spp̅S Experiments
- UA1: Underground Area 1
- UA2: Underground Area 2
- UA4: Underground Area 4
- UA5: Underground Area 5

Spp̅S pre-accelerators
- PS: Proton Synchrotron
- AA: Antiproton Accumulator

UA8 experiment was a high-energy physics experiment at the Proton-Antiproton Collider at CERN. The proposal for the experiment was done by physicists at the University of California, and it was approved in April 1985. Its spokesperson was Peter Schlein.

The aim of the experiment was to search for and study jets in high mass collisions at 630 GeV center-of-mass energy, in order to elucidate the nature of the pomeron and its possible particle structure.

The measurement were done in collaboration with the UA2 experiment, and triggered on a minimum transverse energy in the UA2 calorimeter system and a diffractive recoil proton signature in a system of Roman pot wire chambers. UA8 was placed at the same interaction point as the UA2 experiment, and was designed in such a way that it could record data in parallel with UA2.

UA8 was the first time a Roman pot was used to trigger a central collider experiment. A very clean signal for jets in diffractive dissociation was observed after the first year of data-taking, and so the new field of "hard diffraction" was born.

== See also ==
- List of Super Proton Synchrotron experiments
- UA1 experiment
- UA2 experiment
