= UA2 experiment =

Particle physics experiment at CERN

Super Proton–Antiproton Synchrotron (Spp̅S)
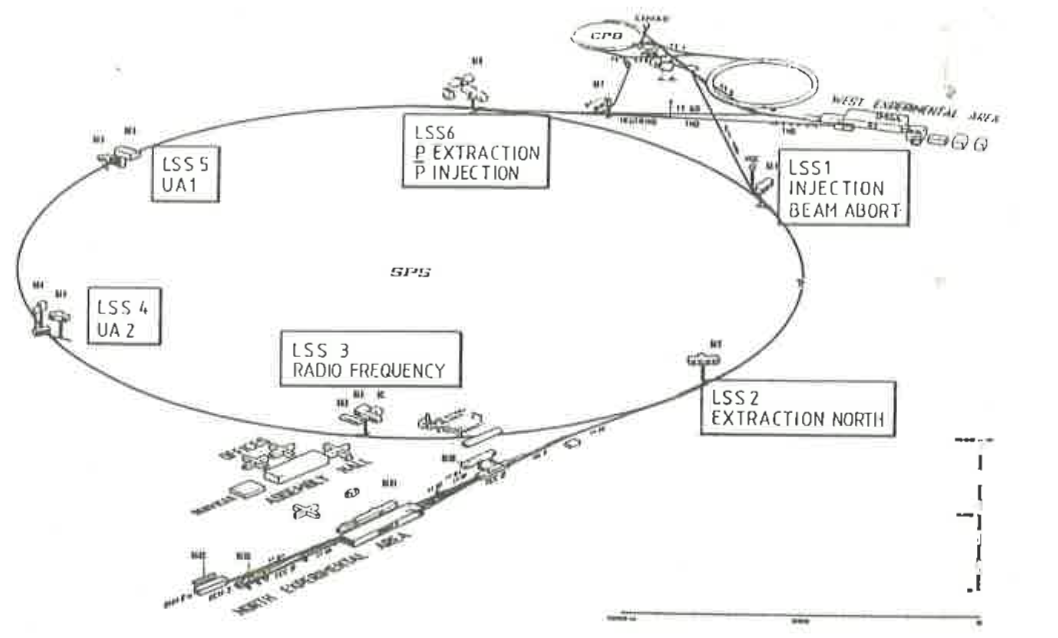

Key Spp̅S Experiments
- UA1: Underground Area 1
- UA2: Underground Area 2
- UA4: Underground Area 4
- UA5: Underground Area 5

Spp̅S pre-accelerators
- PS: Proton Synchrotron
- AA: Antiproton Accumulator

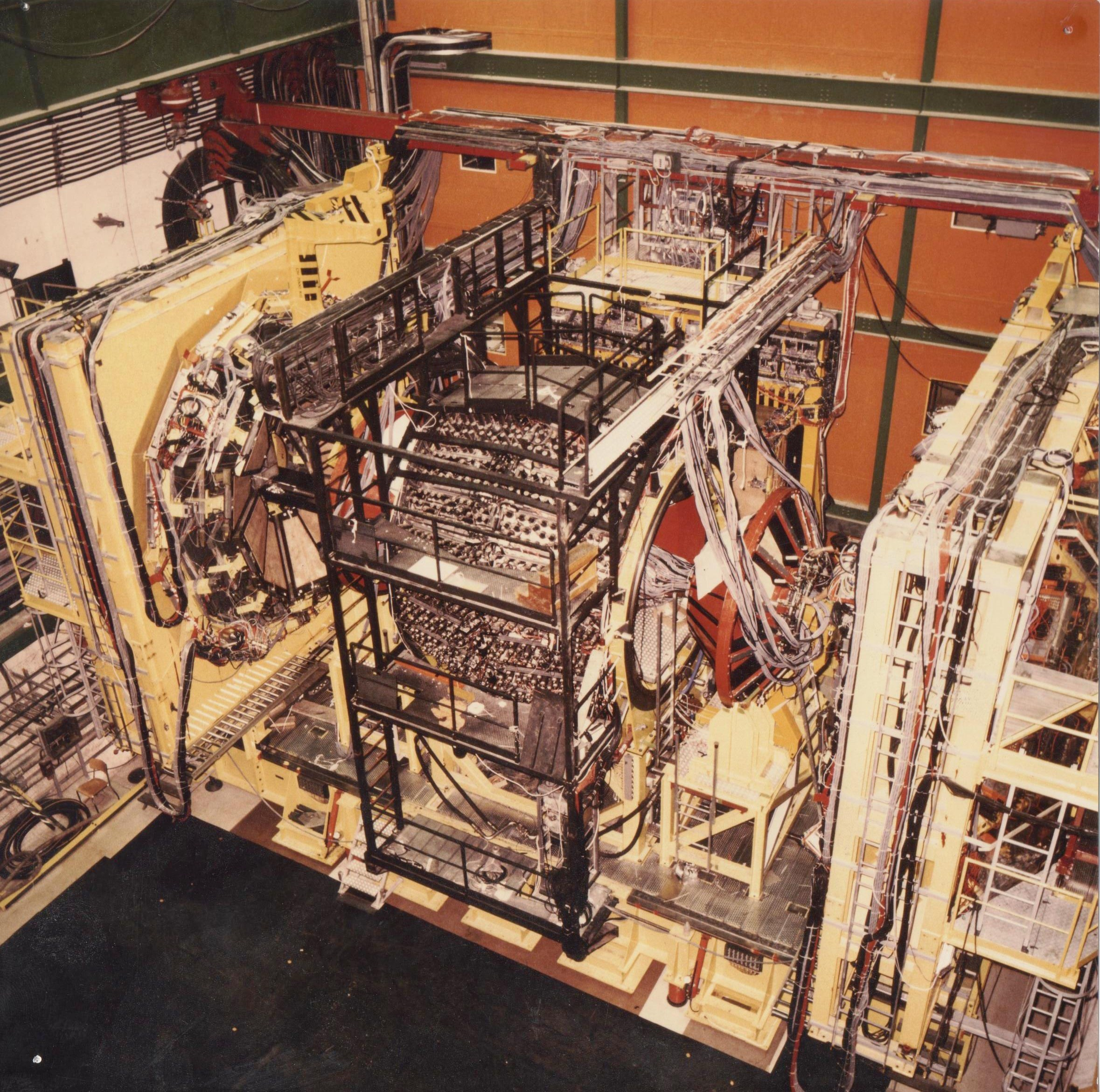
The UA2 detector shown in open position at the CERN Proton-Antiproton Collider in 1982

The Underground Area 2 (UA2) experiment was a high-energy physics experiment at the Proton-Antiproton Collider (Spp̅S) — a modification of the Super Proton Synchrotron (SPS) — at CERN. The experiment ran from 1981 until 1990, and its main objective was to discover the W and Z bosons. UA2, together with the UA1 experiment, succeeded in discovering these particles in 1983, leading to the 1984 Nobel Prize in Physics being awarded to Carlo Rubbia and Simon van der Meer. The UA2 experiment also observed the first evidence for jet production in hadron collisions in 1981, and was involved in the searches of the top quark and of supersymmetric particles. Pierre Darriulat was the spokesperson of UA2 from 1981 to 1986, followed by Luigi Di Lella from 1986 to 1990.

== Background ==
Around 1968 Sheldon Glashow, Steven Weinberg, and Abdus Salam came up with the electroweak theory, which unified electromagnetism and weak interactions, and for which they shared the 1979 Nobel Prize in Physics. The theory postulated the existence of W and Z bosons, and the pressure on the research community to prove the existence of these particles experimentally was substantial. During the 70s it was established that the masses of the W and Z bosons were in the range of 60 to 80 GeV (W boson) and 75 to 92 GeV (Z boson) — energies too large to be accessible by any accelerator in operation at that time. In 1976, Carlo Rubbia, Peter McIntyre and David Cline proposed to modify a proton accelerator — at that time a proton accelerator was already running at Fermilab and one was under construction at CERN (SPS) — into a proton–antiproton collider, able to reach energies large enough to produce W and Z bosons. The proposal was adopted at CERN in 1978, and the Super Proton Synchrotron (SPS) was modified to occasionally operate as a proton-antiproton collider (Spp̅S).

== History ==
On 29 June 1978 the UA1 experiment was approved. Two proposals for a second detector, with the same purpose as UA1, were made the same year. On 14 December 1978, the proposal of Pierre Darriulat, Luigi Di Lella and collaborators, was approved. Like UA1, UA2 was a moveable detector, custom built around the beam pipe of the collider, which searched proton–antiproton collisions for signatures of the W and Z particles. The UA2 experiment began operating in December 1981. The initial UA2 collaboration consisted of about 60 physicists from Bern, CERN, Copenhagen, Orsay, Pavia and Saclay.

From 1981 to 1985, the UA1 and UA2 experiments collected data corresponding to an integrated luminosity of approximately 0.9 pb^{−1}. From 1985 to 1987 the Spp̅S was upgraded, and the luminosity of the machine increased by a factor 10 compared to the previous performance. The UA2 sub-detectors were also upgraded, making the detector hermetic, which increased its ability to measure missing transverse energy.

The second experimental phase ran from 1987 to 1990. Groups from Cambridge, Heidelberg, Milano, Perugia and Pisa joined the collaboration, which grew to about 100 physicists. During this phase, UA2 accumulated data corresponding to an integrated luminosity of 13.0 pb^{−1} in three major running periods. After nearly ten years of operation, the UA2 experimental program stopped running at the end of 1990.

== Components and operation ==
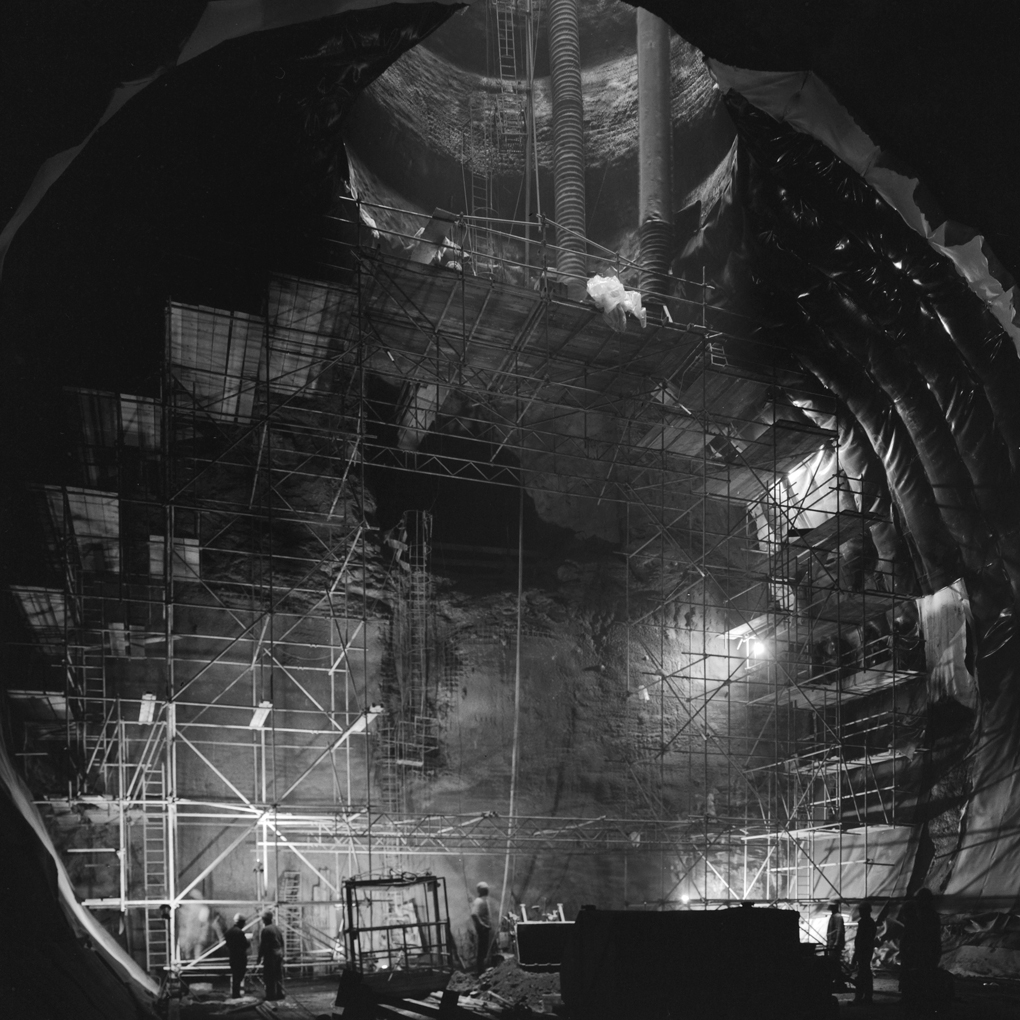
Civil engineering for the underground experimental hall at LSS4

The UA1 and UA2 experiments recorded data during proton–antiproton collision operation and moved back after periods of data taking, so that the SPS could revert to fixed-target operation. UA2 was moved on air cushions when removed from the beam pipe of the Spp̅S.

=== Construction ===
The UA2 experiment was located some 50 meters underground, in the ring of the SPS/Spp̅S accelerator, and was housed in a big cavern. The cavern was large enough to house the detector, provide room for it to be assembled in a "garage position" without shutting down the accelerator and to where it was also moved back after periods of data taking. The accelerator could therefore revert to fixed-target operation, after periods of operating as a collider.

=== Detectors ===
The UA1 and the UA2 experiments had many things in common; they were both operating on the same accelerator and both had the same objective (to discover the W and Z bosons). The main difference was the detector design; UA1 was a multipurpose detector, while UA2 had a more limited scope. UA2 was optimized for the detection of electrons from W and Z decays. The emphasis was on a highly granular calorimeter – a detector measuring how much energy particles deposit – with spherical projective geometry, which also was well adapted to the detection of hadronic jets. Charged particle tracking was performed in the central detector utilising a combination of multi-wire proportional chambers and drift chambers and hodoscopes. Energy measurements were performed in the calorimeters. Unlike UA1, UA2 had no muon detector.

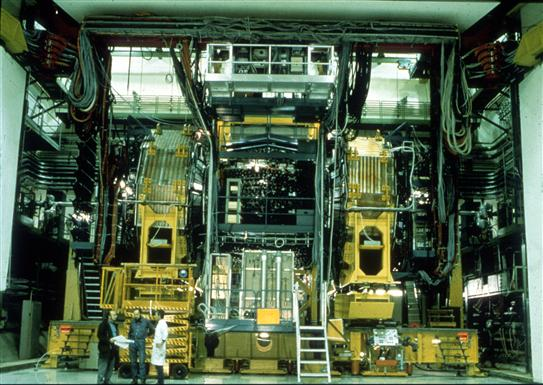
Detector for the UA2 experiment. The picture shows the detector after the 1985-1987 upgrade, when new end-cap calorimeters were added to improve the search for the top quark and new physics.

The calorimeter had 24 slices, each weighing 4 tons. These slices were arranged around the collision point like segments of an orange. Particles ejected from the collision produced showers of secondary particles in the layers of heavy material. These showers passed through layers of plastic scintillators, generating light which was read with photomultiplier by the data collection electronics. The amount of light was proportional to the energy of the original particle. Accurate calibration of the central calorimeter allowed the W and Z masses to be measured with a precision of about 1%.

=== Upgrades of the detector ===
The 1985-1987 upgrade of the detector was aimed at two aspects: full calorimeter coverage and better electron identification at lower transverse momenta. The first aspect was addressed by replacing the end-caps with new calorimeters that covered the regions 6°-40° with respect to the beam direction, thereby hermetically sealing the detector. The end-cap calorimeters consisted of lead/scintillator samplings for the electromagnetic part, and iron/scintillator for the hadronic part. The performance and granularity of the new calorimeters were set to match the central calorimeter, which was of importance for the triggering system.

The electron identification was improved by the use of a completely new central tracking detector assembly, partly consisting of a pioneering silicone-pad detector. In 1989, the collaboration pushed this concept even further by developing a Silicon Pad Detector (SPD) with finer pad segmentation to be placed directly around the collision region beam pipe. This detector was built as a cylinder, closely surrounding the beam pipe. The detector had to fit into the available space of less than 1 cm. It was therefore necessary to miniaturize the components of the detector. This was achieved with two brand new technologies: the silicon sensor and the application-specific integrated circuit (ASIC). Existing electronics were too bulky, and therefore a novel ASIC had to be developed. This was the first silicon tracker adapted to a collider experiment, a technology prior to the present silicon detectors.

== Results ==
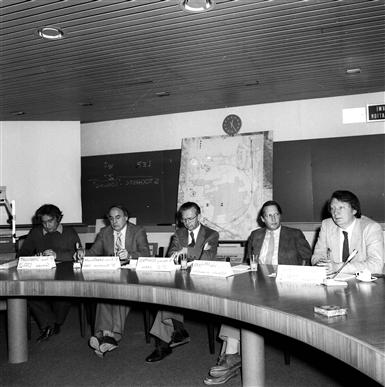
Press conference on 25 January 1983 when the announcement was made of the discovery of the W boson at CERN. From right to left: Carlo Rubbia, spokesperson of the UA1 experiment; Simon van der Meer, responsible for developing the stochastic cooling technique; Herwig Schopper, Director-General of CERN; Erwin Gabathuler, Research Director at CERN, and Pierre Darriulat, spokesperson of the UA2 experiment.

=== Hadronic jets at high transverse momentum ===
The very first result of the UA2 collaboration, published on 2 December 1982, was the first unambiguous observation of hadronic jet production at high transverse momentum from hadronic collisions. Observations of hadronic jets confirmed that the theory of quantum chromodynamics could describe the gross features of the strong parton interaction.

=== Discovery of the W and Z bosons ===
The UA2 and UA1 collaboration chose to search for the W boson by identifying its leptonic decay, because the hadronic decays, although more frequent, have a larger background. By the end 1982, the Spp̅S had reached high enough luminosity to permit the observation of $W \rightarrow e \nu$ and $W \rightarrow \mu \nu$ decays. On 22 January 1983, the UA2 collaboration announced that the UA2 detector had recorded four events that were candidates for a W boson. This brought the combined number of candidate events seen by UA1 and UA2 up to 10. Three days later, CERN made a public announcement that the W boson was found.

The next step was to track down the Z boson. However, the theory said that the Z boson would be ten times rarer than the W boson. The experiments therefore needed to collect several times the data collected in the 1982 run that showed the existence of the W boson. With improved techniques and methods, the luminosity was increased substantially. These efforts were successful, and on 1 June 1983, the formal announcement of the discovery of the Z boson was made at CERN.

=== Search for the top quark ===
Throughout the runs with the upgraded detector, the UA2 collaboration was in competition with experiments at Fermilab in the US in the search for the top quark. Physicists had anticipated its existence since 1977, when its partner — the bottom quark — was discovered. It was felt that the discovery of the top quark was imminent.

During the 1987-1990 run UA2 collected 2065 $W \rightarrow e \nu$ decays, and 251 Z decays to electron pairs, from which the ratio of the mass of the W boson and the mass of the Z boson could be measured with a precision of 0.5%. By 1991 a precise measurement for the mass of the Z boson from LEP had become available. Using the ratio of the W mass to Z mass, a first precise measurement of the W mass could be made. These mass values could be used to predict the top quark from its virtual effect on the W mass. The result of this study gave a top quark mass value in the range of 110 GeV to 220 GeV, beyond the reach for direct detection by UA2 at the Spp̅S. The top quark was ultimately discovered in 1995 by physicists at Fermilab with a mass near 175 GeV.

== See also ==
- List of Super Proton Synchrotron experiments
