= UA1 experiment =

Particle physics experiment at CERN

Super Proton–Antiproton Synchrotron (Spp̅S)
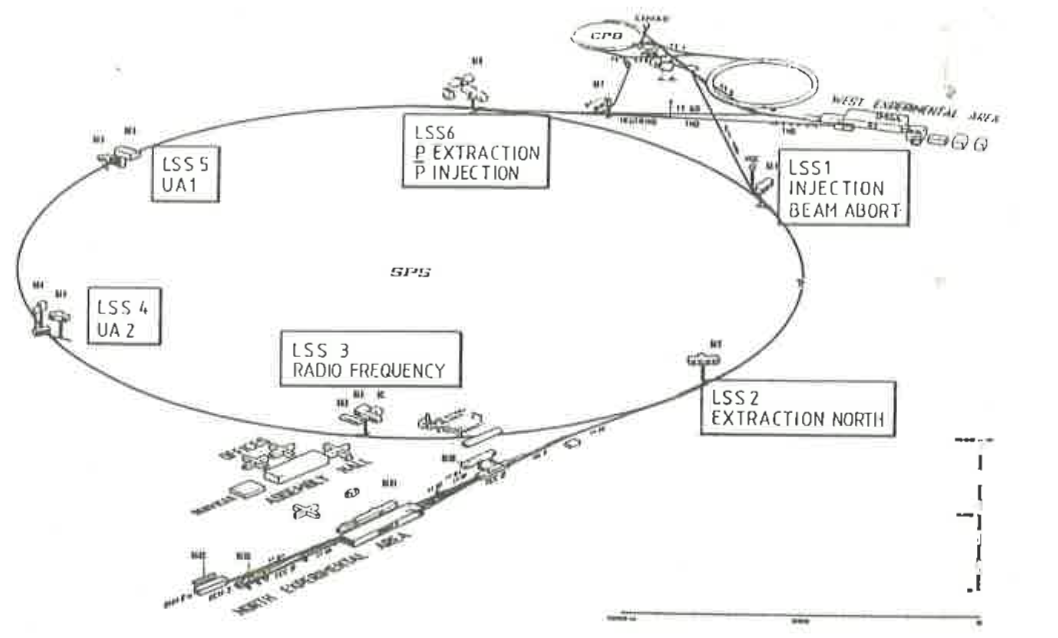

Key Spp̅S Experiments
- UA1: Underground Area 1
- UA2: Underground Area 2
- UA4: Underground Area 4
- UA5: Underground Area 5

Spp̅S pre-accelerators
- PS: Proton Synchrotron
- AA: Antiproton Accumulator

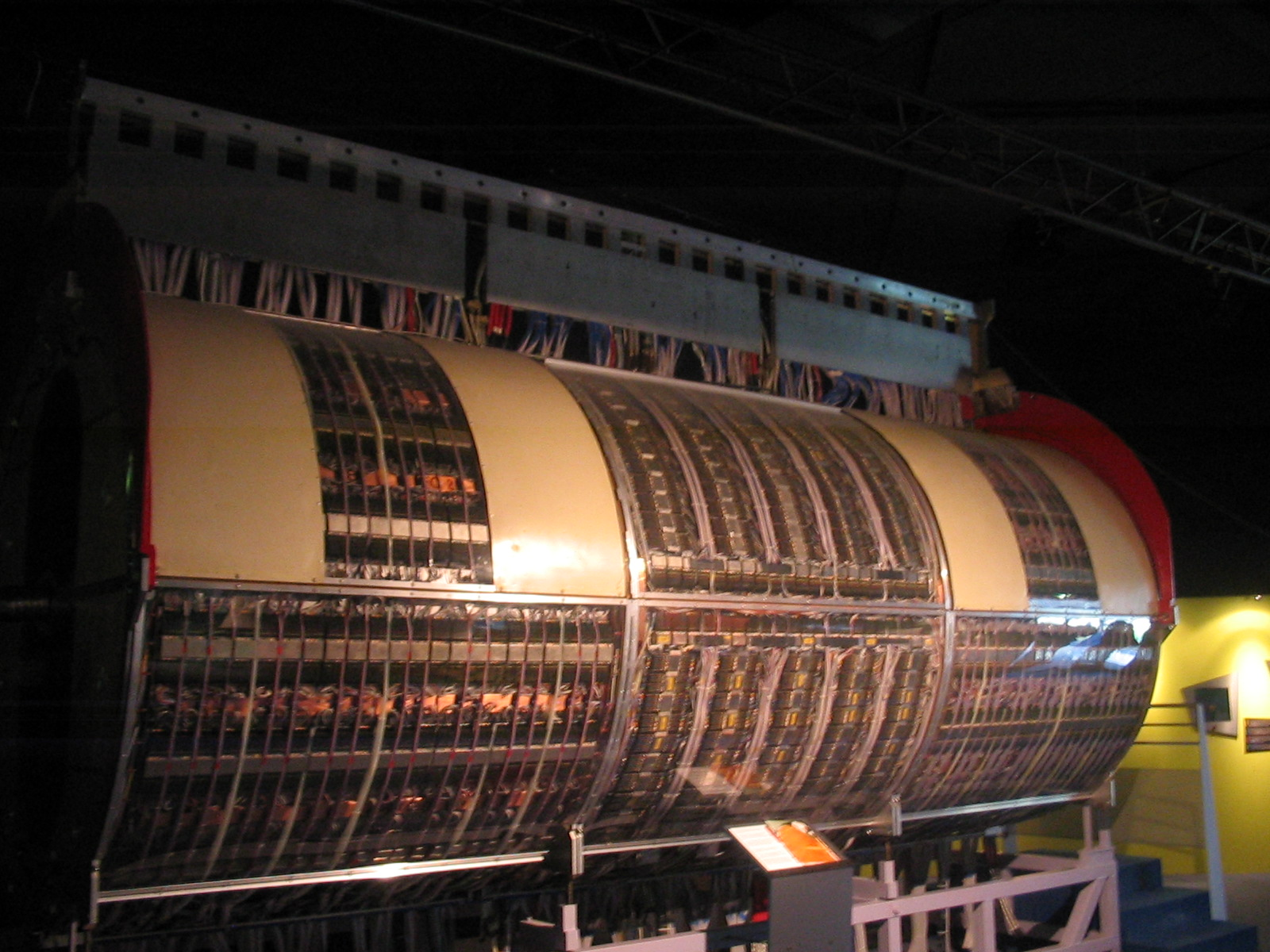
The central section of the UA1 experiment on display at the Microcosm museum at CERN

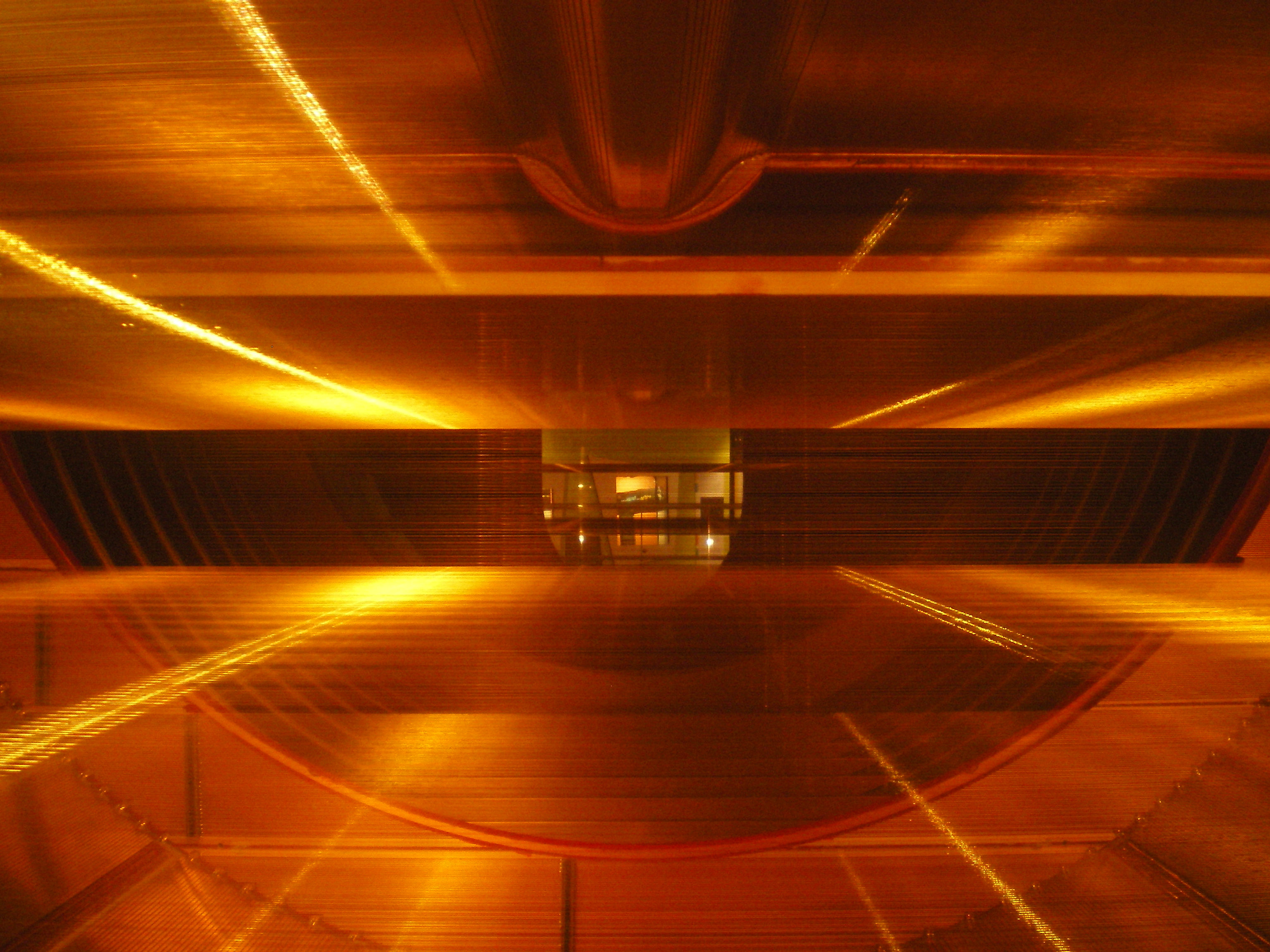
Interior of the central section of the UA1 experiment on display at the Microcosm museum at CERN

The UA1 experiment (an abbreviation of Underground Area 1) was a high-energy physics experiment that ran at CERN's Proton-Antiproton Collider (Spp̅S), a modification of the one-beam Super Proton Synchrotron (SPS). The data was recorded between 1981 and 1990. The joint discovery of the W and Z bosons by this experiment and the UA2 experiment in 1983 led to the Nobel Prize for physics being awarded to Carlo Rubbia and Simon van der Meer in 1984. Peter Kalmus and John Dowell, from the UK groups working on the project, were jointly awarded the 1988 Rutherford Medal and Prize from the Institute of Physics for their outstanding roles in the discovery of the W and Z particles.

It was named as the first experiment in a CERN "Underground Area" (UA), i.e. located underground, outside of the two main CERN sites, at an interaction point on the SPS accelerator, which had been modified to operate as a collider. The UA1 central detector was crucial to understanding the complex topology of proton-antiproton collisions. It played a most important role in identifying a handful of W and Z particles among billions of collisions.

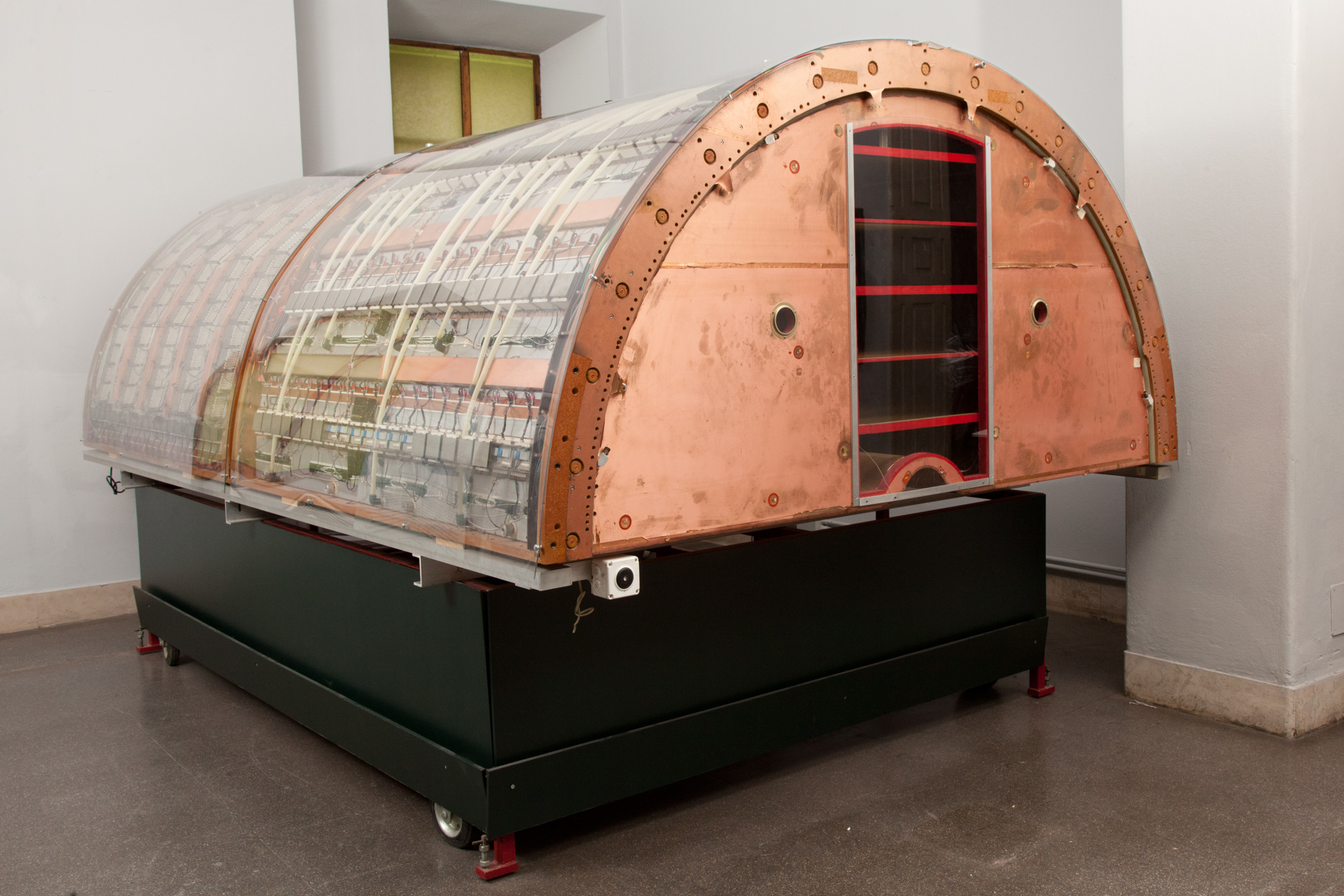
Section of the UA1 detector at Museo nazionale della scienza e della tecnologia Leonardo da Vinci of Milan

After the discovery of the W and Z boson, the UA1 collaboration went on to search for the top quark. Physicists had anticipated its existence since 1977, when its partner — the bottom quark — was discovered. It was felt that the discovery of the top quark was imminent. In June 1984, Carlo Rubbia at the UA1 experiment expressed to the New York Times that evidence of the top quark "looks really good". Over the next months it became clear that UA1 had overlooked a significant source of background. The top quark was ultimately discovered in 1994–1995 by physicists at Fermilab with a mass near 175 GeV.

The UA1 was a huge and complex detector for its day. It was designed as a general-purpose detector. The detector was a 6-chamber cylindrical assembly 5.8 m long and 2.3 m in diameter, the largest imaging drift chamber of its day. It recorded the tracks of charged particles curving in a 0.7 tesla magnetic field, measuring their momentum, the sign of their electric charge and their rate of energy loss (dE/dx). Atoms in the argon-ethane gas mixture filling the chambers were ionised by the passage of charged particles. The electrons which were released drifted along an electric field shaped by field wires and were collected on sense wires. The geometrical arrangement of the 17000 field wires and 6125 sense wires allowed a spectacular 3-D interactive display of reconstructed physics events to be produced.

The UA1 detector was conceived and designed in 1978/9, with the proposal submitted in mid-1978.

Since the end of running, the magnet used in the UA1 experiment has been used for other high energy physics experiments, notably the NOMAD and T2K neutrino experiments.

== See also ==
- UA2 experiment
- List of Super Proton Synchrotron experiments
