= Antiproton Accumulator =

Part of the CERN proton-antiproton collider

Super Proton–Antiproton Synchrotron (Spp̅S)
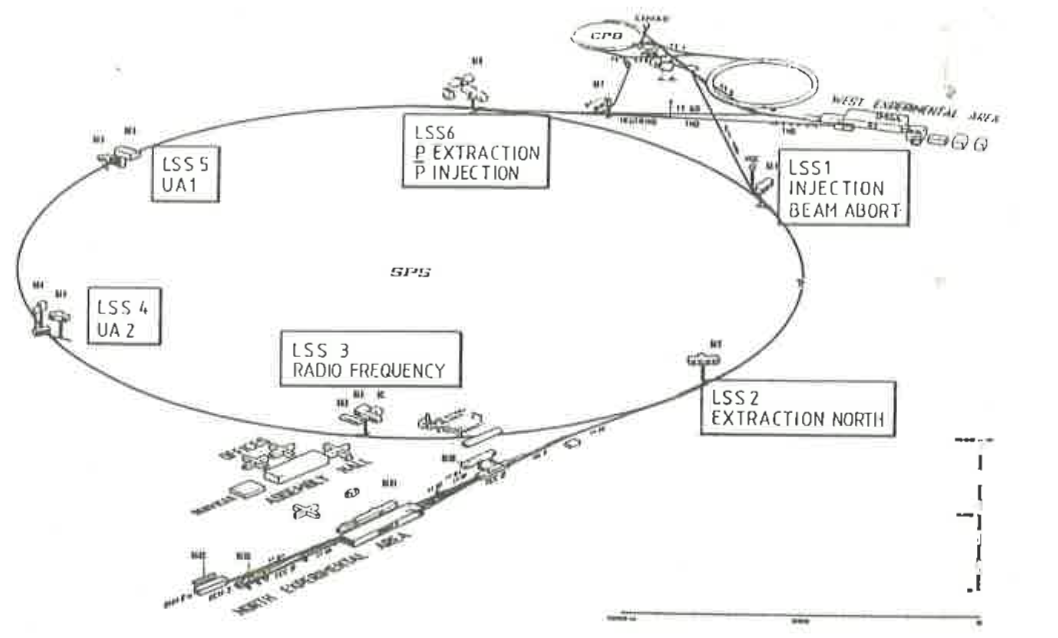

Key Spp̅S Experiments
- UA1: Underground Area 1
- UA2: Underground Area 2
- UA4: Underground Area 4
- UA5: Underground Area 5

Spp̅S pre-accelerators
- PS: Proton Synchrotron
- AA: Antiproton Accumulator

The Antiproton Accumulator (AA) was an infrastructure connected to the Proton–Antiproton Collider (Spp̅S) – a modification of the Super Proton Synchrotron (SPS) – at CERN. The AA was built in 1979 and 1980, for the production and accumulation of antiprotons. In the Spp̅S the antiprotons were made to collide with protons, achieving collisions at a center of mass energy of app. 540 GeV (later raised to 630 GeV and finally, in a pulsed mode, to 900 GeV). Several experiments recorded data from the collisions, most notably the UA1 and UA2 experiment, where the W and Z bosons were discovered in 1983.

The concept of the project was developed and promoted by C. Rubbia, for which he received the Nobel prize in 1984. He shared the prize with Simon van der Meer, whose invention of the method of stochastic cooling made large scale production of antiprotons possible for the first time.

== Operation ==
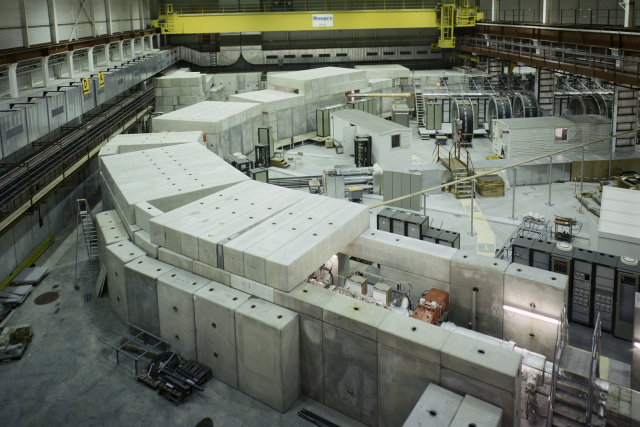
Overview of the Antiproton Accumulator (AA) at CERN

Antiprotons were produced by directing an intense proton beam at a momentum of 26 GeV/c from the Proton Synchrotron (PS) onto a target for production. The emerging burst of antiprotons had a momentum of 3.5 GeV/c, and was selected via a spectrometer, and injected into the AA. The produced antiprotons would have a substantial momentum spread, which was decreased during a 2 s orbit around the AA, using Simon van der Meers method of stochastic cooling. The antiprotons were then trapped using a radiofrequency system, and moved inwards in the orbit to a stacking region. A next burst of antiprotons arrived 2.4 s (the PS cycle time) after the preceding one. This process was repeated during the whole accumulation period, which took about a day. The most intense stack, obtained after many days, would typically contain 5.2·10^{11} antiprotons.

The dense core of antiprotons was then ejected from the AA, and accelerated to 26 GeV/c, using the PS. Three antiproton bunches were consecutively transferred to the Spp̅S, every 2.4 s. Just before the antiproton transfer, the PS would already have accelerated and transferred three proton bunches circulating the opposite direction to the antiprotons. When three bunches of antiprotons and three bunches of protons have filled the Spp̅S, the bunches were accelerated to 315 GeV, and the beams were circulated for hours. During this time the AA continued to accumulate, to be ready for the next day's transfer.

== Antimatter experiments ==
Antimatter facilities
Low Energy Antiproton Ring (1982–1996)
- Antiproton Accumulator: Antiproton production
- Antiproton Collector: Decelerated and stored antiprotons

Antimatter Factory (2000–present)
- Antiproton Decelerator (AD): Decelerates antiprotons
- Extra Low Energy Antiproton ring (ELENA): Decelerates antiprotons received from AD

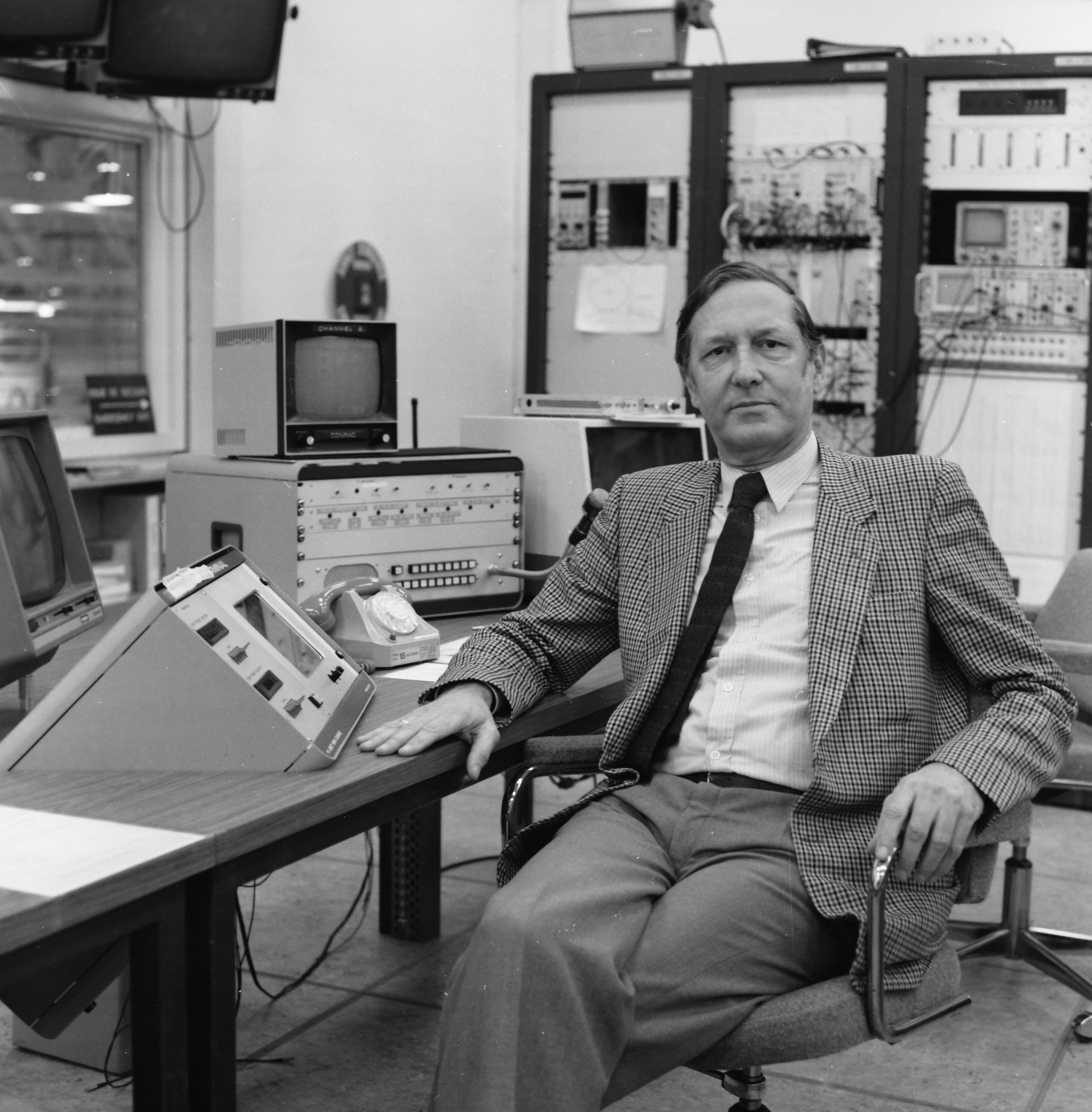
Simon van der Meer in the Antiproton Accumulator Control Room, 1984

From the beginning of the project, the potential of physics with low-energy antiprotons was recognized. A Low Energy Antiproton Ring (LEAR) was built and received antiprotons from the AA from 1983 on, for deceleration to as low as 100 MeV/c. The first artificially created antimatter, in the form of anti-Hydrogen, was created in a trapping experiment at LEAR in 1995. However, the first client for antiprotons from the AA had been the Intersecting Storage Rings (ISR), where proton-antiproton collisions were achieved early in 1981.

== Upgrade of the Antiproton Accumulation system ==
To satisfy the need for more antiprotons, the ACOL (Antiproton COLlector) project was conceived in 1983 and implemented in 1986 and 1987. The antiproton production (target and target area) was upgraded; the Antiproton Collector (AC), with an acceptance in transverse and longitudinal phase-space much larger than that of the AA, was built tightly around the AA; and the AA was consequently modified. The AA accumulation rate, previously typically 10^{11} antiprotons per day, was thus raised by an order of magnitude, to typically 10^{12}.

AC and AA together were referred to as the Antiproton Accumulation Complex (AAC). The AAC was one of the most highly automated complex of accelerators of its time.

After the last run of the Spp̅S, in 1991, LEAR remained the sole client of the AAC, and a simpler way to serve low-energy physics was sought. LEAR was converted to become the Low Energy Ion Ring (LEIR), the AA was dismantled, and the AC was converted to become the Antiproton Decelerator (AD).

== See also ==
- UA1 experiment
- UA2 experiment
- Stochastic cooling
- W and Z bosons
- Antiproton Collector
- Super Proton–Antiproton Synchrotron
