= Low Energy Antiproton Ring =

Former CERN infrastructure

Antimatter facilities
Low Energy Antiproton Ring (1982–1996)
- Antiproton Accumulator: Antiproton production
- Antiproton Collector: Decelerated and stored antiprotons

Antimatter Factory (2000–present)
- Antiproton Decelerator (AD): Decelerates antiprotons
- Extra Low Energy Antiproton ring (ELENA): Decelerates antiprotons received from AD

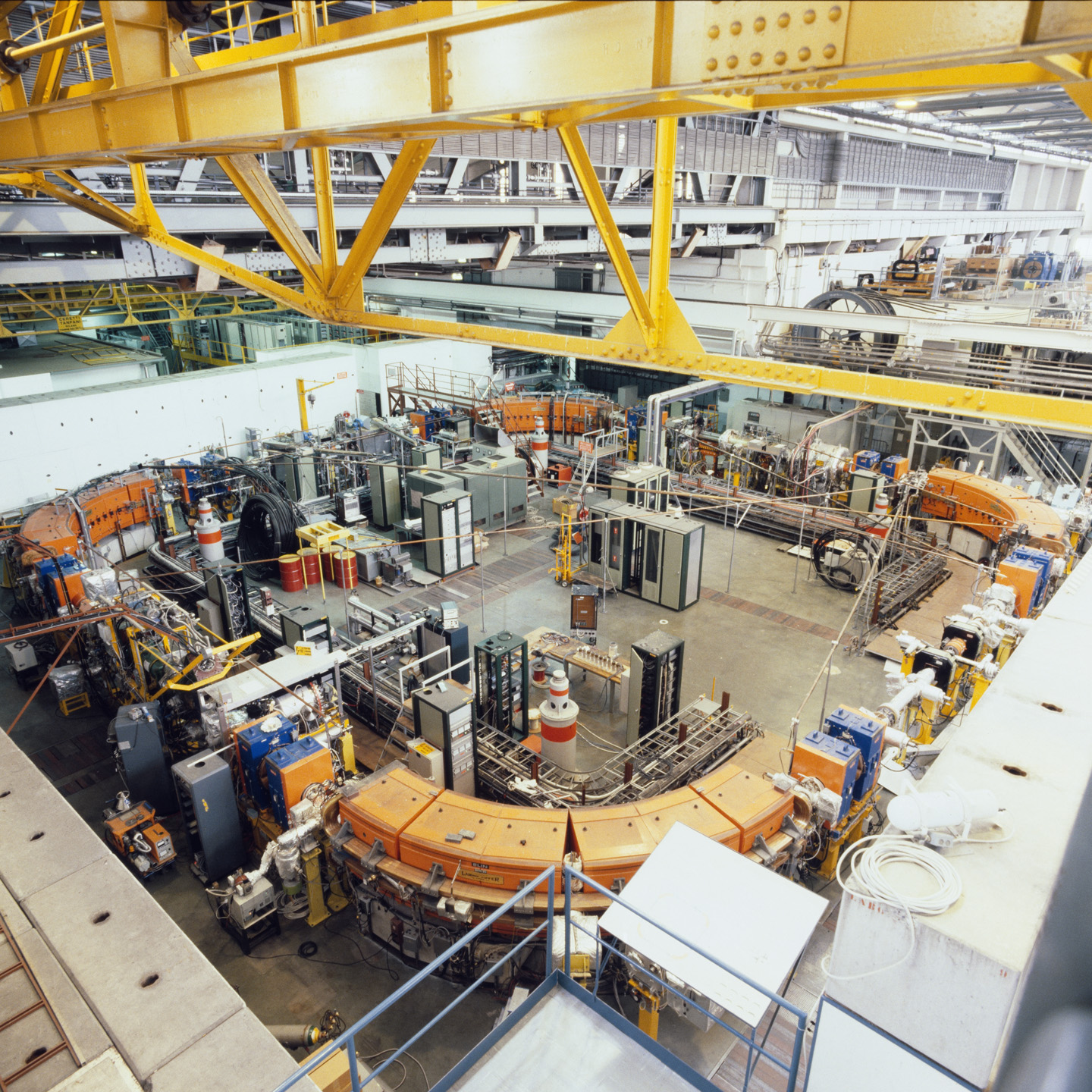
The Low Energy Antiproton Ring (LEAR) at CERN

The Low Energy Anti-Proton Ring (LEAR) was a particle accelerator at CERN which operated from 1982 until 1996. The ring was designed to decelerate and store antiprotons, to study the properties of antimatter and to create atoms of antihydrogen. Antiprotons for the ring were created by the CERN Proton Synchrotron via the Antiproton Collector and the Antiproton Accumulator (AA). The creation of at least nine atoms of antihydrogen were confirmed by the PS210 experiment in 1995.

== Experimental setup ==
LEAR is a multipurpose storage ring located in the South Hall of the Proton Synchrotron (PS), with a circumference of 78.5 m. Four straight sections are alternated with compact 90° bending magnets, along with eight quadrupole doublets. The straight sections each consist of an 8m long section, where equipment such as apparatus for internal beams and electron cooling can be stored, and two short sections of 1m. The C-type (bending) magnets used are open to the outside of the ring for injection and ejection. The vacuum system used for LEAR is designed for baking at 300 °C.

Bunches of usually a few 10^{9} antiprotons are skimmed off the AA and then decelerated by the PS from 3.5 GeV/c to 0.6 GeV/c. The bunch was transferred to LEAR where it could be decelerated to a minimum 100 MeV/c or accelerated to generally 1000 MeV/c. For most experiments, a "beam stretcher mode" was used, where an ultra-slow extraction provided a high-duty (continuous) amount of antiprotons. Another mode, "internal target", kept a beam circulating for hours, or even days, until most particles were consumed by a gas jet target.

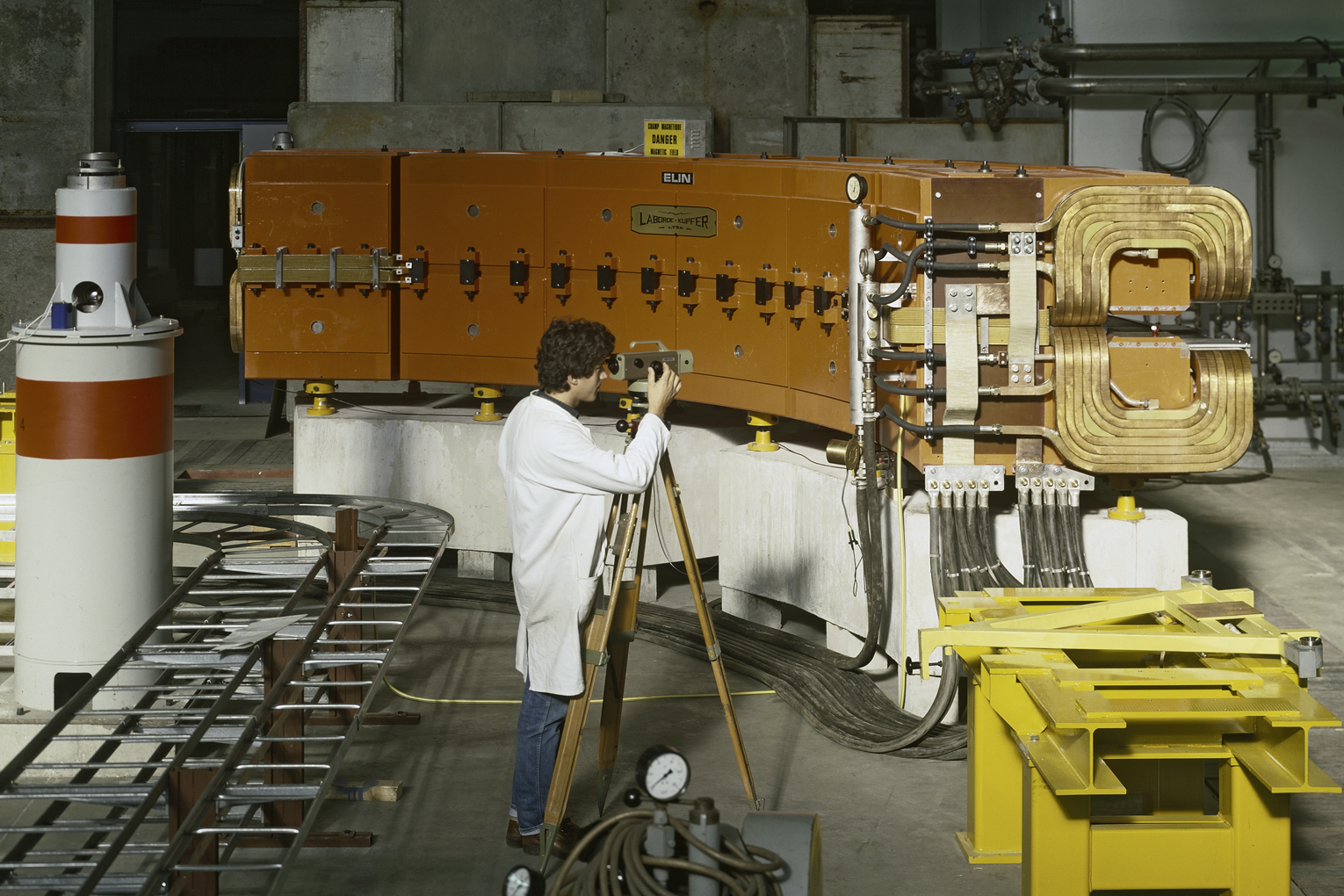
LEAR bending magnet quadrant

Stochastic cooling is implemented at several stages of the LEAR experimental setup, at different momenta. The focus of stochastic cooling is to restrict the motion of particles in the beam and control their energies close to a certain value. From 1987, the setup included electron cooling, using the electron cooler from the Initial Cooling Experiment (ICE) to complement the stochastic cooling. Using cooling, high quality beams at low energies and low emittances could be produced.

== Results ==
There was a total of 27 experiments performed during LEAR's 14 years of running. Several meson spectroscopy experiments were set up at LEAR to analyse the rare meson resonances produced in nucleon-antiproton annilhilation. These included the Crystal Barrel, OBELIX and JETSET experiments. Furthermore, matter-antimatter symmetry was investigated by studying specific proton-antiproton interactions, resulting in detailed measurements of CP violation. The mass difference between the proton and antiproton was also studied at LEAR with an accuracy in 1 part in 10^{10}.

== Conversion to LEIR ==
In 1996, LEAR was converted into the Low Energy Ion Ring, which has since been used in the lead ion injection process for the Large Hadron Collider. Low energy antiproton research continues at CERN using the Antiproton Decelerator. It was built as a successor for LEAR and started operation in 2000.
