= Simon van der Meer =

Dutch physicist (1925–2011)

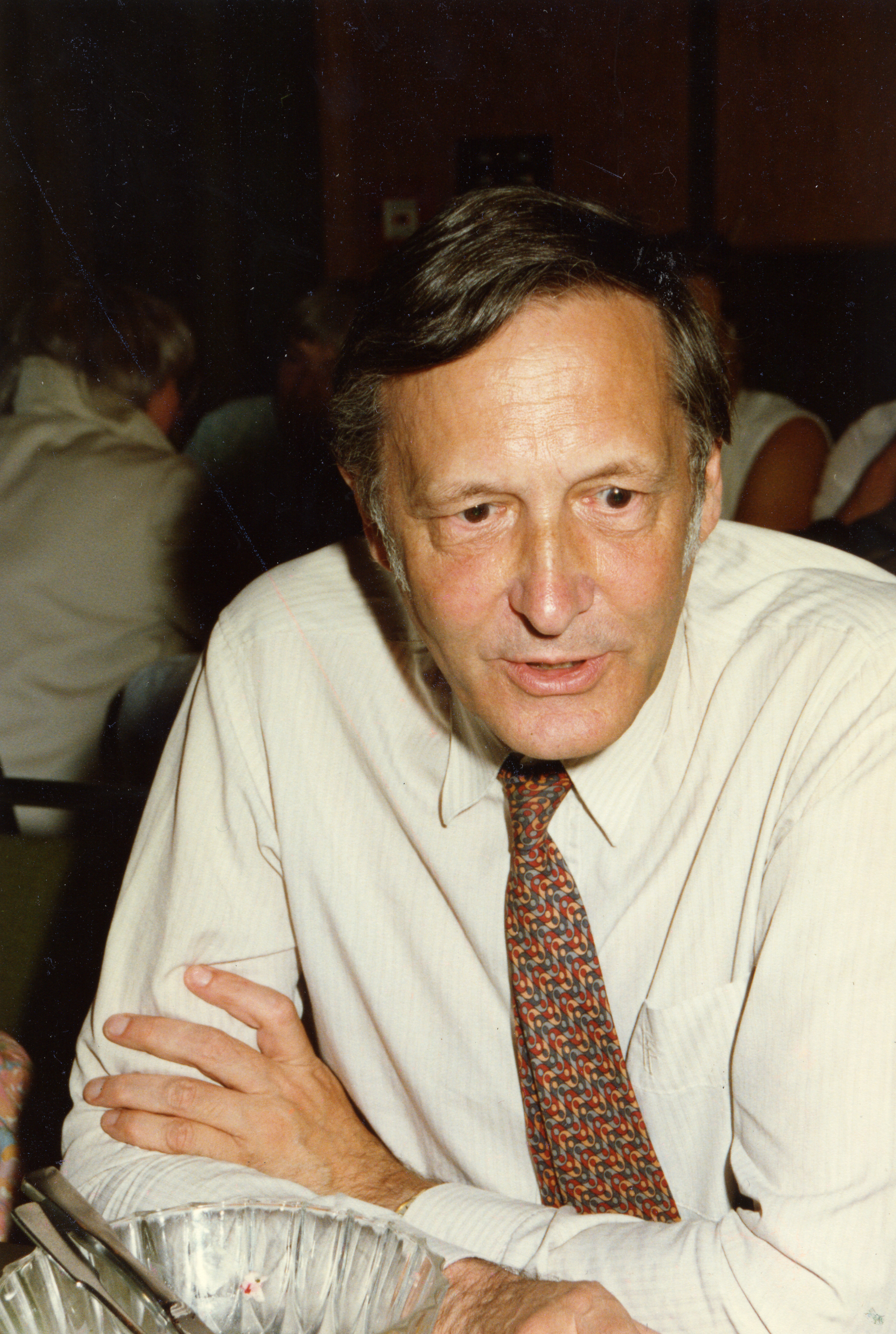
- van der Meer in 1988
- Born: 24 November 1925; The Hague, Netherlands
- Died: 4 March 2011 (aged 85); Geneva, Switzerland
- Education: Delft University of Technology
- Known for: Discovery of W and Z bosons Stochastic cooling Van der Meer horn
- Awards: Duddell Medal and Prize (1982); Nobel Prize in Physics (1984)
- Scientific career
- Fields: Physics
- Workplaces: CERN

Simon van der Meer (24 November 1925 – 4 March 2011) was a Dutch particle accelerator physicist who shared the Nobel Prize in Physics in 1984 with Carlo Rubbia for contributions to the CERN project which led to the discovery of the W and Z particles, the two fundamental communicators of the weak interaction.

== Biography ==
One of four children, Simon van der Meer was born and grew up in The Hague, the Netherlands, in a family of teachers. He was educated at the city's gymnasium, graduating in 1943 during the German occupation of the Netherlands. He studied Technical Physics at the Delft University of Technology, and received an engineer's degree in 1952. After working for Philips Research in Eindhoven on high-voltage equipment for electron microscopy for a few years, he joined CERN in 1956 where he stayed until his retirement in 1990.

Van der Meer was a relative of Nobel Prize winner Tjalling Koopmans – they were first cousins once removed. In the mid-1960s, Van der Meer married Catharina M. Koopman; they had a daughter and a son.

== Work at CERN ==
In the 1950s, Van der Meer designed magnets for the 28 GeV Proton Synchrotron (PS) In 1961, he invented a pulsed focusing device, known as the ‘Van der Meer horn’. Such devices are necessary for long-base-line neutrino facilities and are used even today.

That was followed in the 1960s by the design of a small storage ring for a physics experiment studying the anomalous magnetic moment of the muon. Soon after and in the following decade, Van der Meer did some very innovative work on the regulation and control of power supplies for the Intersecting Storage Rings (ISR) and, later, the SPS.

Van der Meer's ISR Collider days in the 1970s led to his technique for luminosity calibration of colliding beams, first used at the ISR and still used today at the LHC, as well as in other colliders.

The Nobel Prize committee recognised Van der Meer's idea of stochastic cooling and its application at CERN in the late 1970s and 1980s, specifically in the Antiproton Accumulator, which supplied antiprotons to the Proton-Antiproton Collider.

During his work at the ISR, Van der Meer developed a technique using steering magnets to vertically displace the two colliding beams with respect to each other; this permitted the evaluation of the effective beam height, leading to an evaluation of the beam luminosity at an intersection point. The famous ‘Van der Meer scans’ are indispensable even today in the LHC experiments; without these, the precision of the calibration of the luminosity at the intersection points in the Collider would be much lower.

For the new SPS machine constructed in the early seventies, he proposed that the generation of the reference voltages for the bending and quadrupole supplies should be based on measurements of the field along the cycle, and gave an outline of the correction algorithms. His proposal resulted in the first ever computer-controlled closed-loop system for a geographically distributed system, as the 7 km circumference SPS was; this was a no simple feat for the early 1970s. Measurements of the main magnet currents were introduced only later, when the SPS had to run as a storage ring for the SPS p–pbar collider.

Van der Meer's expertise in accelerators and computer programming enabled the development of complex applications and tools to manage the antiproton source accelerators and the transfer of antiprotons to the SPS Collider. Between 1987 and 1996, the AA and AC antiproton source complex was among the most automated systems within CERN's accelerator infrastructure.

== Nobel prize ==
Van der Meer invented the technique of stochastic cooling of particle beams. His technique was used to accumulate intense beams of antiprotons for head-on collision with counter-rotating proton beams at 540 GeV centre-of-mass energy or 270 GeV per beam in the Super Proton Synchrotron at CERN. Such collisions produced W and Z bosons which could be detected for the first time in 1983 by the UA1 experiment, led by Carlo Rubbia. The W and Z bosons had been theoretically predicted some years earlier, and their experimental discovery was considered a significant success for CERN. Van der Meer and Rubbia shared the 1984 Nobel Prize for their decisive contributions to the project.

Van der Meer and Ernest Lawrence are the only two accelerator physicists who have won the Nobel prize.

Apart from his Nobel Prize, Van der Meer also became a member of the Royal Netherlands Academy of Arts and Sciences in 1984.
