= Antiproton Collector =

CERN infrastructure

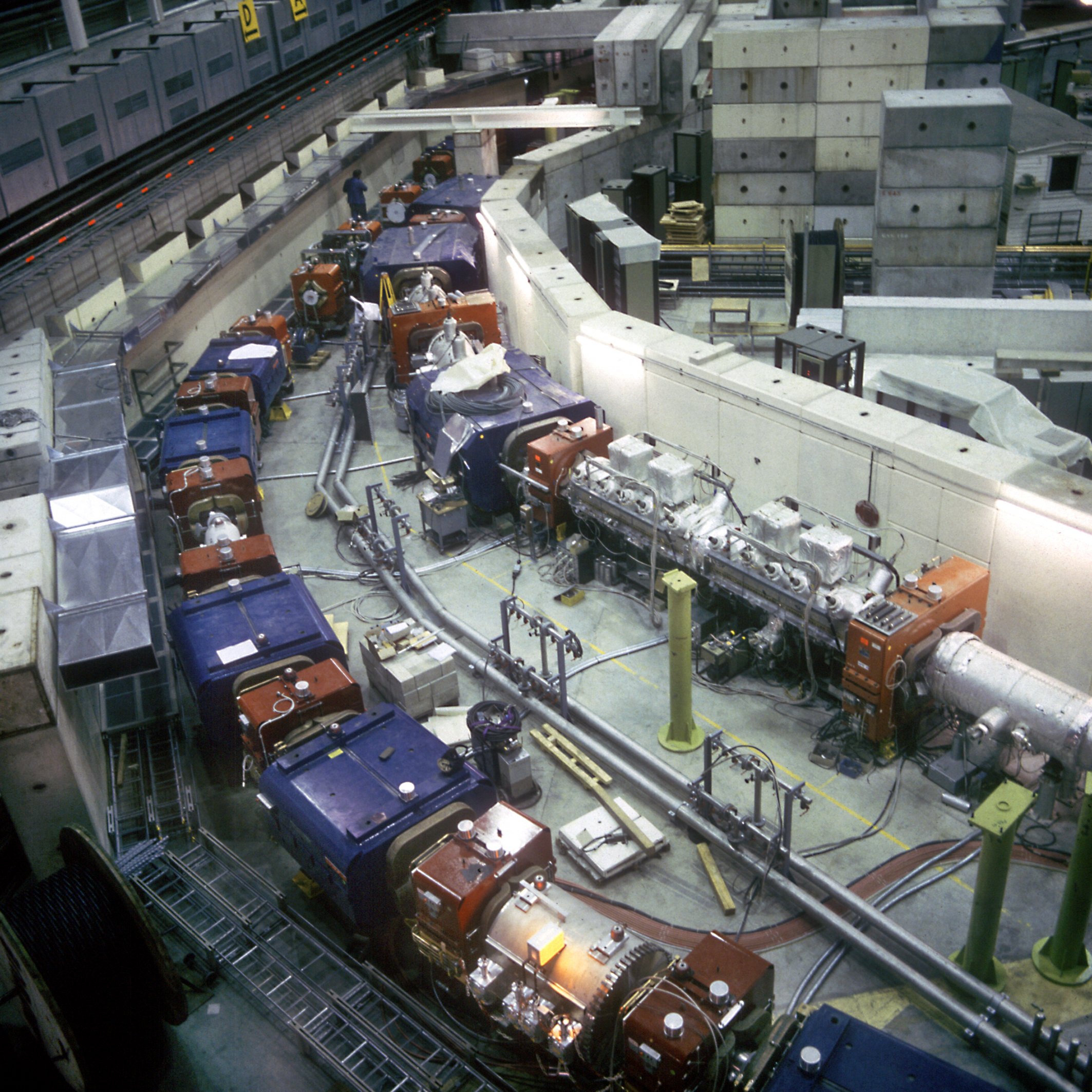
Overview of the Antiproton Accumulator (AA) and Antiproton Collector (AC) at CERN

The Antiproton Collector (AC) was part of the antiparticle factory at CERN designed to decelerate and store antimatter, to study the properties of antimatter and to create atoms of antihydrogen. It was built in 1986 around the existing Antiproton Accumulator (AA) to improve the antiproton production by a factor of 10. Together, the Antiproton Collector and the Antiproton Accumulator formed the so-called Antiproton Accumulator Complex (AAC).

Low energy antiproton research continues at CERN using the Antiproton Decelerator. It was built as a successor to LEAR and started operation in 2000.

== History ==
Antimatter facilities
Low Energy Antiproton Ring (1982–1996)
- Antiproton Accumulator: Antiproton production
- Antiproton Collector: Decelerated and stored antiprotons

Antimatter Factory (2000–present)
- Antiproton Decelerator (AD): Decelerates antiprotons
- Extra Low Energy Antiproton ring (ELENA): Decelerates antiprotons received from AD

After the Antiproton Accumulator (AA) had been operational since 1980, the update program ACOL (Antiproton COLlector) was proposed in 1983. The update comprised improvement work on the antiproton source, the construction of the Antiproton Collector (AC), as well as reconstructions of the injection and ejection systems of the Antiproton Accumulator (AA) and its stochastic cooling system. The estimated budget of the upgrade program was 40.2 million CHF. The changes were implemented during 1986 and 1987, with the AC getting constructed tightly around the existing AA ring.

The Antiproton Accumulator Complex (AAC) served its last particles to the Proton-Antiproton Collider Spp̅S in 1991. After the (Spp̅S) was shut down, AAC continued to produce antiprotons for LEAR. Operation stopped in 1997, when the AA was dismantled and the AC was converted into the Antiproton Decelerator (AD).

== Operation ==
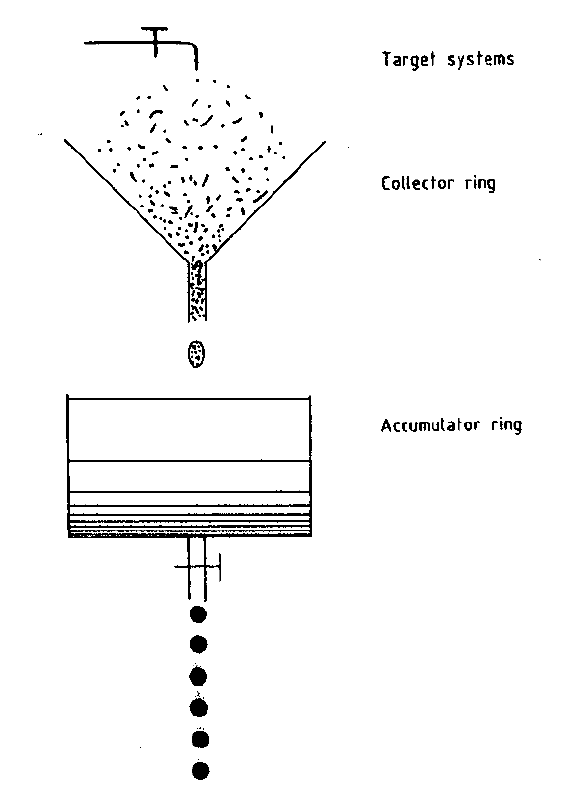
Sketch of hydraulic analogon of the Antiproton Accumulator Complex (see text for further explanation)

The main scope of the Antiproton Collector (AC) was to increase the antiproton luminosity in CERN's accelerator complex. Upgrading to the AC increased the number of available antiprotons tenfold to around 4.5×10^{9} antiprotons per second. The reason for this was the much larger acceptance of the AC compared to the Antiproton Accumulator (AA) alone. Additionally, several methods to compress the antiproton beams' phase space volume were applied, e.g. stochastic cooling.

The antiprotons were produced by accelerating protons onto a target. The resulting antiprotons emitted by the target material had a large divergence, which called for special devices to focus them. Instead of quadrupole magnets, which are conventionally used to focus particle beams, rods of solid lithium with an applied high gradient magnetic field were implemented.

The functionality of the Antiproton Accumulator Complex can be well understood through the analogon of a hydraulic system, which is depicted in the included picture. The tap represents the target systems that produce antiprotons. These are collected in the collector ring with a large acceptance (the funnel). The accumulator ring can be compared to a reservoir, where the antiprotons are accumulated and eventually released as even, well defined bunches.

== See also ==
- Antiproton Accumulator
- Stochastic cooling
- Super Proton–Antiproton Synchrotron
