= PS210 experiment =

Scientific experiment

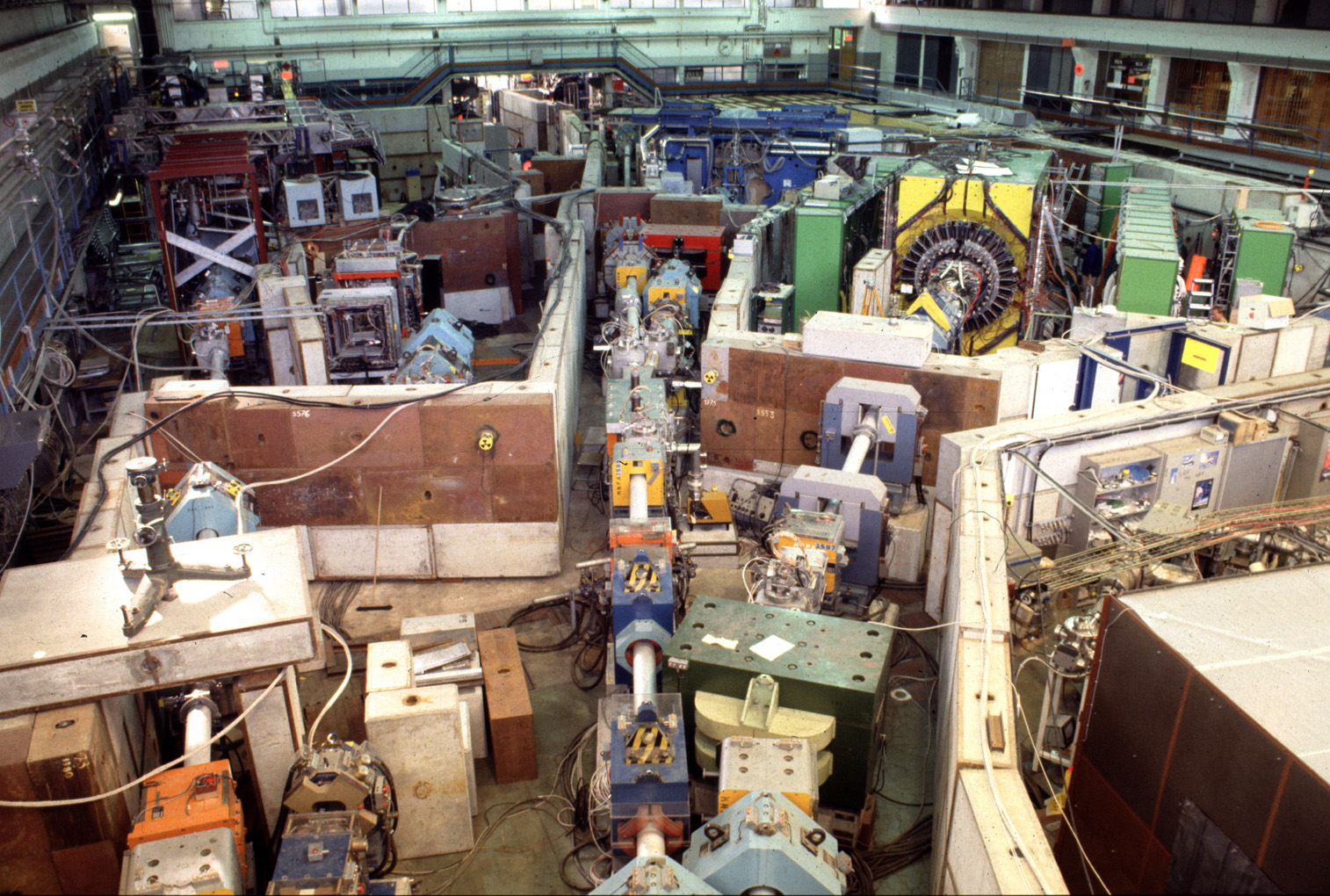
PS210 in the Low Energy Antiproton Ring experimental area at CERN

The PS210 experiment was the first experiment that led to the observation of antihydrogen atoms produced at the Low Energy Antiproton Ring (LEAR) at CERN in 1995. The antihydrogen atoms were produced in flight and moved at nearly the speed of light. They made unique electrical signals in detectors that destroyed them almost immediately after they formed by matter–antimatter annihilation.

Eleven signals were observed, of which two were attributed to other processes. In 1997 similar observations were announced at Fermilab from the E862 experiment. The first measurement demonstrated the existence of antihydrogen, the second (with improved setup and intensity monitoring) measured the production rate. Both experiments, one at each of the only two facilities with suitable antiprotons, were stimulated by calculations which suggested the possibility of making very fast antihydrogen within existing circular accelerators.
