= Super Proton–Antiproton Synchrotron =

Particle accelerator at CERN

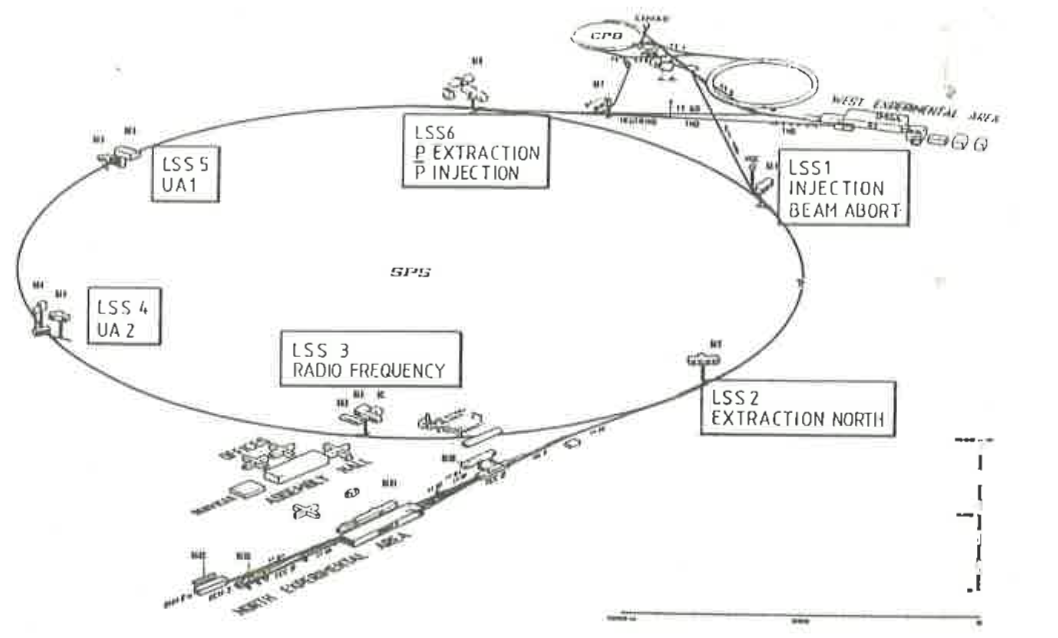
Schematics of the Spp̅S complex

The Super Proton–Antiproton Synchrotron (or Spp̅S, also known as the Proton–Antiproton Collider) was a particle accelerator that operated at CERN from 1981 to 1991. To operate as a proton-antiproton collider the Super Proton Synchrotron (SPS) underwent substantial modifications, altering it from a one beam synchrotron to a two-beam collider. The main experiments at the accelerator were UA1 and UA2, where the W and Z bosons were discovered in 1983. Carlo Rubbia and Simon van der Meer received the 1984 Nobel Prize in Physics for their contributions to the Spp̅S-project, which led to the discovery of the W and Z bosons. Other experiments conducted at the Spp̅S were UA4, UA5 and UA8.

== Background ==
Around 1968 Sheldon Glashow, Steven Weinberg, and Abdus Salam came up with the electroweak theory, which unified the electromagnetic and weak interactions, and for which they shared the 1979 Nobel Prize in Physics. The theory postulated the existence of W and Z bosons. It was experimentally established in two stages, the first being the discovery of neutral currents in neutrino scattering by the Gargamelle collaboration at CERN, a process that required the existence of a neutral particle to carry the weak force—the Z boson. The results from the Gargamelle collaboration made calculations of the masses of the W and Z bosons possible. It was predicted that the W boson had a mass value in the range of 60 to 80 GeV/c^{2}, and the Z boson in the range from 75 to 92 GeV/c^{2}—energies too large to be accessible by any accelerator in operation at that time. The second stage of establishing the electroweak theory would be the discovery of the W and Z bosons, requiring the design and construction of a more powerful accelerator.

During the late 70s, CERN's prime project was the construction of the Large Electron–Positron Collider (LEP). Such a machine was ideal to produce and measure the properties of W and Z bosons. However, due to the pressure to find the W and Z bosons, the CERN community felt like it could not wait for the construction of LEP—a new accelerator was needed, whose construction could not be at the expense of LEP. In 1976 Carlo Rubbia, Peter McIntyre, and David Cline proposed to modify a proton accelerator—at that time, a proton accelerator was already running at Fermilab and one was under construction at CERN (SPS)— into a proton–antiproton collider. Such machine required only a single vacuum chamber, unlike a proton-proton collider that requires separate chambers due to magnetic fields oppositely directed. Since the protons and antiprotons are of opposite charge, but of same energy E, they can circulate in the same magnetic field in opposite directions, providing head-on collisions between the protons and the antiprotons at a total center-of-mass energy $\sqrt{s}=2E$. The scheme was proposed both at Fermilab in the United States, and at CERN, and was ultimately adopted at CERN for the Super Proton Synchrotron (SPS).

W and Z bosons are produced mainly as a result of quark-antiquark annihilation. In the parton model, the momentum of a proton is shared between the proton's constituencies: a portion of the proton momentum is carried by the quarks, and the remainder by gluons. It would not be sufficient to accelerate protons to a momentum equal to the mass of the boson, as each quark would only carry a portion of the momentum. To produce bosons in the estimated intervals of 60 to 80 GeV/c^{2} (W boson) and 75 to 92 GeV/c^{2} (Z boson), one would therefore need a proton-antiproton collider with a center-of-mass energy of approximately six times the boson masses, about 500–600 GeV. The design of the Spp̅S was determined by the need to detect the decay Z → e^{+} + e^{−}. As the cross-section for Z production at ~600 GeV is ~1.6 nb, and the fraction of Z → e^{+} + e^{−} decay is ~3%, a luminosity of L = 2.5×10^{29} cm^{−2}s^{−1} would give an event rate of ~1 per day. To achieve such luminosity, one would need an antiproton source capable of producing ~3×10^{10} antiprotons each day, distributed in a few bunches with angular and momentum acceptance of the SPS.

== History ==
The SPS was originally designed as a synchrotron for protons, to accelerate one proton beam to 450 GeV and extract it from the accelerator for fixed-target experiments. However, already before the construction period of the SPS, the idea of using it as a proton-antiproton accelerator came up.

The first proposal for a proton-antiproton collider seems to have been made by Gersh Budker and Alexander Skrinsky at Orsay in 1966, based on Budker's new idea of electron cooling. In 1972 Simon van der Meer published the theory of stochastic cooling, for which he later received the 1984 Nobel Prize in Physics. The theory was confirmed in the Intersecting Storage Rings at CERN in 1974. While electron cooling might have led to the idea of a proton-antiproton collider, it was eventually stochastic cooling that was used in the preaccelerators to prepare antiprotons for the Spp̅S.

Meanwhile, the discovery of neutral currents in the Gargamelle experiment at CERN prompted Carlo Rubbia and collaborators to propose a proton-antiproton collider. In 1978, the project was approved by the CERN Council, and the first collisions occurred in July 1981. The first run lasted until 1986, and after a substantial upgrade it continued operation from 1987 to 1991. The collider was shut down at the end of 1991, as it was no longer competitive with the 1.5 TeV proton-antiproton collider at Fermilab, which had been in operation since 1987.

== Operation ==
Between 1981 and 1991 SPS would operate part of the year as a synchrotron, accelerating a single beam for fixed-target experiments, and part of the year as a collider—Spp̅S.

Typical parameters	Spp̅S
Injection momentum [GeV/c]	26
Top momentum [GeV/c]	315
Integrated luminosity in 1990 [nb^{−1}]	6790
Proton bunch intensity	12·10^{10}
Antiproton bunch intensity	5·10^{10}
Number of bunches per beam	6
Number of collision points	3

=== Modifications of the SPS for collider operation ===
The requirements of a storage ring as the Spp̅S, in which beams must circulate for many hours, are much more demanding than those of a pulsed synchrotron, such as the SPS. After the Spp̅S was decided in 1978, the following modifications were done on the SPS:

- To transfer the antiprotons from the PS to the SPS, a new beam line was constructed, along with a new injection system for counter-clockwise injection.
- As SPS was designed for a 14 GeV/c injection and the new injection would be 26 GeV/c, the injection system had to be upgraded.
- Improvement of the SPS beam vacuum system. The design vacuum of 2×10^{−7} Torr was adequate for SPS—as a synchrotron, the beam would be accelerated to 450 GeV and extracted during a very short time. The Spp̅S would have a storage time of 15 to 20 hours, and the vacuum had to be improved by almost three orders of magnitude.
- The accelerating radio-frequency system had to undergo modifications for simultaneous accelerations of protons and antiprotons. The proton and antiproton bunches had to be precisely synchronized for collisions to occur at the center of the detectors.
- Beam diagnostics had to be adapted to low beam intensities. New devices were added, such as directional couplers for independent observation of protons and antiprotons.
- Construction of huge experimental areas for experiments (UA1 and UA2). The beam abort system had to be moved to make place for the experiments.

=== Antiproton production ===
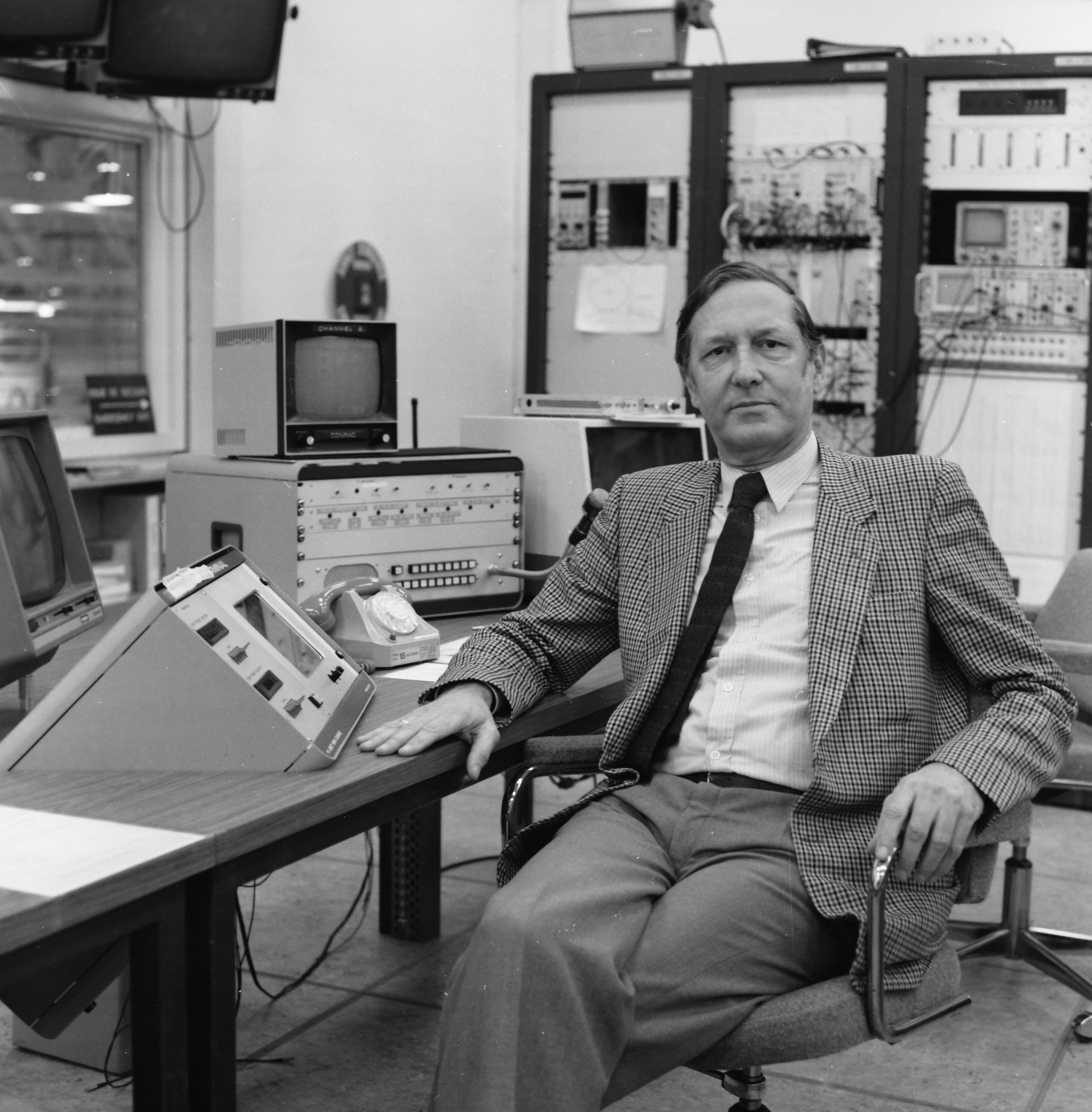
Simon van der Meer in the Antiproton Accumulator Control Room, 1984

The creation and storage of antiprotons in sufficient numbers was one of the biggest challenges in the construction of the Spp̅S. The production of antiprotons required use of existing CERN infrastructure, such as the Proton Synchrotron (PS) and the Antiproton Accumulator (AA). Antiprotons were produced by directing an intense proton beam at a momentum of 26 GeV/c from the PS onto a target for production. The emerging burst of antiprotons had a momentum of 3.5 GeV/c, and was magnetically selected and steered into the AA, and stored for many hours. The main obstacle was the large dispersion of momenta and angles of the antiprotons emerging from the target. The method of reducing the beam dimensions is called stochastic cooling, a method discovered by Simon van der Meer. Simply put, it is a feedback system based on the fact that all beams are particulate and that therefore, on a microscopic level, the density within a given volume will be subject to statistical fluctuations. The aim of discovering W and Z bosons put certain demands on the luminosity of the collider, and the experiment therefore required an antiproton source capable of delivering 3×10^{10} antiprotons each day into a few bunches within the angular and momentum acceptance of the SPS. The accumulation of the antiprotons in the AA could take several days. The upgrade of 1986–1988 allowed for a tenfold increase in the stacking rate of the AA. A second ring, called the Antiproton Collector (AC), was built around the AA.

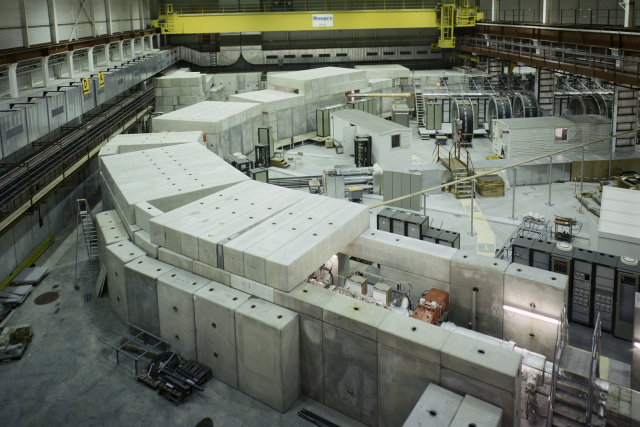
Overview of the Antiproton Accumulator (AA) at CERN

=== Filling ===
After the antiprotons had been stacked up in the AA, the PS and Spp̅S would prepare for a fill. First, three proton bunches, each containing ~10^{11} protons, were accelerated to 26 GeV in the PS, and injected into the Spp̅S. Second, three bunches of antiprotons, each containing ~10^{10} antiprotons were extracted from the AA and injected into the PS. In the PS, the antiproton bunches were accelerated to 26 GeV in the opposite direction of that of the protons, and injected into the Spp̅S. The injections was timed to ensure that bunch crossings in the accelerator would happen in the center of the detectors, UA1 and UA2. The transfer efficiency from the AA to the Spp̅S was about 80%. In the first run, 1981–1986, the Spp̅S accelerated three bunches of protons and three bunches of antiprotons. After the stacking rate of the antiprotons was increased in the upgrade, the number of both protons and antiprotons injected into the collider was increased from three to six.

=== Acceleration ===
When injected into the Spp̅S, both beams were accelerated to 315 GeV. It would then pass into storage for 15 to 20 hours of physics data-taking whilst the AA resumed accumulation in preparation for the next fill. As three bunches of protons and three bunches of antiprotons circulated in the same vacuum chamber, they would meet in six points. UA1 and UA2 were placed in two of these meeting points. Electrostatic separators were used to achieve separation at the unused crossing points away from the experiments Until 1983, the centre-of-mass energy was limited to 546 GeV due to resistive heating of the magnetic coils. The addition of further cooling allowed the machine energy to be pushed up to 630 GeV in 1984.

=== Obtaining collisions at 900 GeV ===
When operated as an accelerator for fixed-target experiments, the SPS can accelerate a beam to 450 GeV, before the beam is extracted within seconds (or a small fraction of a second when used to accelerate a bunches for injection into LHC). However, when operated as a collider, the beam has to be stored in the beam line for hours, and the dipole magnets of the accelerator must keep a constant magnetic field for a longer time. To prevent overheating the magnets, the Spp̅S would only accelerate the beams to 315 GeV. This limit could however be overcome by ramping the magnets between 100 GeV and the machines maximum capacity of 450 GeV. The Spp̅S would accelerate the beams to 450 GeV, keeping them as this energy for a time limited by the heating of the magnets, then decelerate the beams to 100 GeV. The pulsing was operated in such a way that the average dispersion of power in the magnets did not exceed the level of operation at 315 GeV. The Spp̅S occasionally ran pulsed operation after 1985, obtaining collisions at a center-of-mass energy of 900 GeV.

== Findings and Discoveries ==
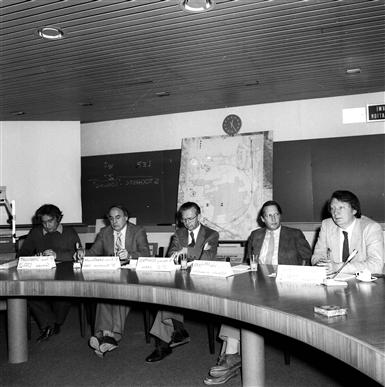
Press conference on 25 January 1983 when the announcement was made of the discovery of the W boson at CERN. From right to left: Carlo Rubbia, spokesperson of the UA1 experiment; Simon van der Meer, responsible for developing the stochastic cooling technique; Herwig Schopper, Director-General of CERN; Erwin Gabathuler, Research Director at CERN, and Pierre Darriulat, spokesperson of the UA2 experiment.

The Spp̅S began its operation in July 1981, and by January 1983 the discovery of the W and Z boson by the UA1 and UA2 experiment were announced. Carlo Rubbia, spokesperson for UA1 experiment, and Simon van der Meer received the 1984 Nobel Prize in Physics for, as stated in the press release from the Nobel Committee, "their decisive contribution to the large project, which led to the discovery of the field particles W and Z". The prize was given to Carlo Rubbia for his "idea to convert an existent large accelerator into a storage ring for protons and antiprotons", i.e. the conception of the Spp̅S, and to Simon van der Meer for his "ingenious method for dense packing and storage of proton, now applied for antiprotons", i.e. devise of the technology enabling the Antiproton Accumulator—stochastic cooling. The conception, construction and operation of the Spp̅S was considered a great technical achievement in itself.

Before the Spp̅S was commissioned, it was debated whether the machine would work at all, or if beam-beam effects on the bunched beams would prohibit an operation with high luminosity. The Spp̅S proved that the beam-beam effect on bunched beams could be mastered, and that hadron colliders were excellent tools for experiments in particle physics. In such regard, it lay the ground work of LHC, the next-generation hadron collider at CERN.

== See also ==
- Super Proton Synchrotron
- List of Super Proton Synchrotron experiments
- UA1 experiment
- UA2 experiment
- Stochastic cooling
- W and Z bosons
