= Carlo Rubbia =

Italian particle physicist and Nobel Prize winner (born 1934)

Senator for Life Carlo Rubbia OMRI OMCA
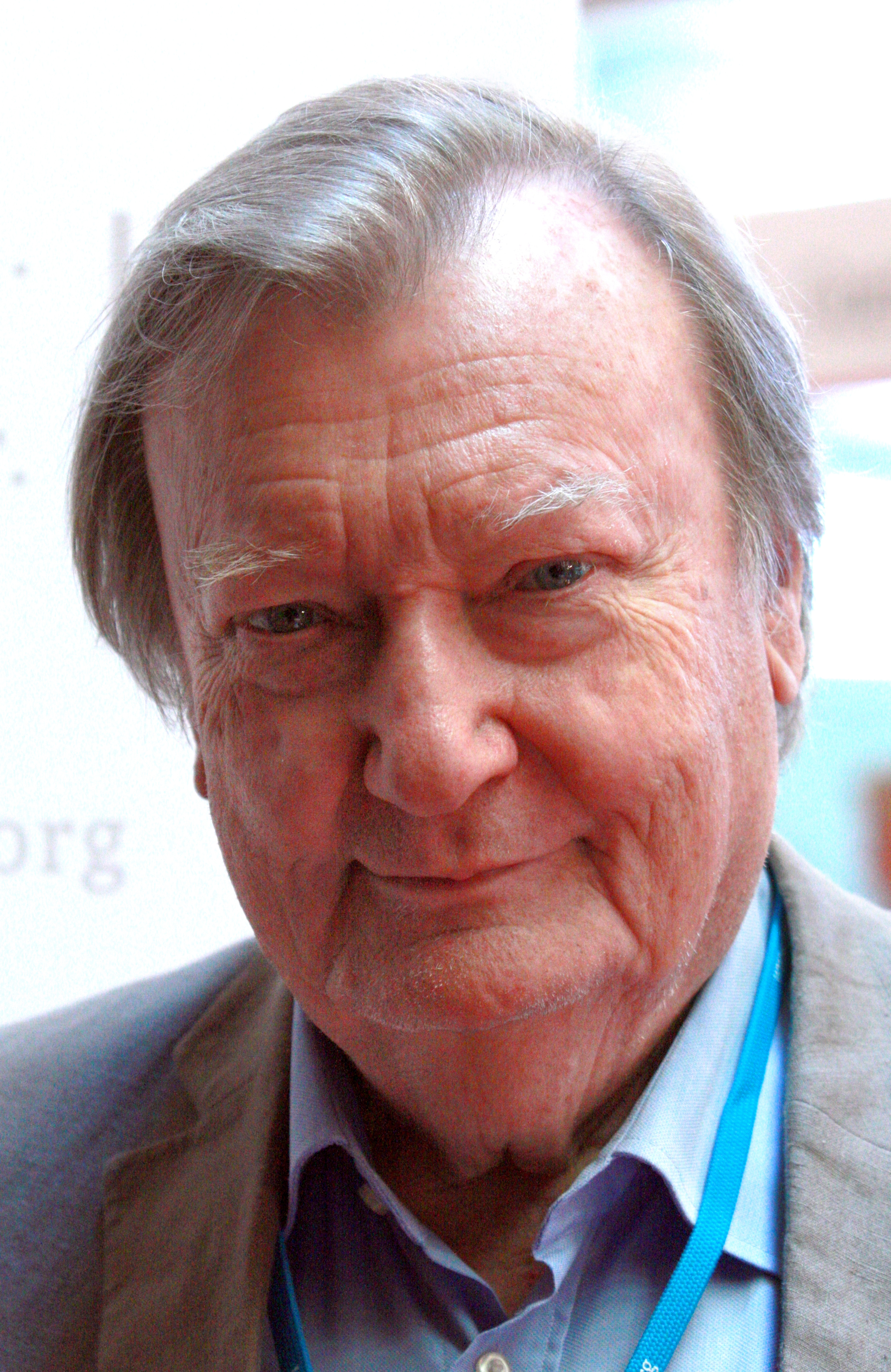
- Rubbia at the 2012 Lindau Nobel Laureate Meeting
- Born: 31 March 1934 (age 92); Gorizia, Friuli-Venezia Giulia, Italy
- Education: Scuola Normale Superiore di Pisa
- Known for: Discovery of W and Z bosons Antiproton Accumulator; Energy amplifier ICARUS experiment
- Awards: Senator for life (2013); OMRI; OMCA; Nobel Prize in Physics (1984); Bakerian Lecture (1985); ForMemRS (1984); Dirac Medal (UNSW) (1989)
- Scientific career
- Fields: Particle physics
- Workplaces: CERN; Columbia University

Member of the Senate of the Republic
- Incumbent
- Life tenure 30 August 2013
- Appointed by: Giorgio Napolitano
- Website: Website

Carlo Rubbia (Italian: [ˈkarlo ˈrubbja]; born 31 March 1934) is an Italian particle physicist and inventor who shared the Nobel Prize in Physics in 1984 with Simon van der Meer for work leading to the discovery of the W and Z particles at CERN.

== Early life and education ==
Rubbia was born in 1934 in Gorizia, an Italian town on the border with Slovenia. His family moved to Venice then Udine because of wartime disruption. His father was an electrical engineer and encouraged him to study the same, though he stated his wish to study physics. In the local countryside, he collected and experimented with abandoned military communications equipment. After taking an entrance exam for the Scuola Normale Superiore di Pisa to study physics, he failed to get into the required top ten (coming eleventh), so began an engineering course in Milan in 1953. Soon after, a Pisa student dropped out, presenting Rubbia with his opportunity. He gained a degree and doctorate in a relatively short time with a thesis on cosmic ray experimentation; his adviser was Marcello Conversi. At Pisa, he met his future wife, Marisa, also a physics student.

== Career and research ==
=== Columbia University ===
Following his degree, Rubbia went to the United States to do postdoctoral research, where he spent about one and a half years at Columbia University performing experiments on the decay and the nuclear capture of muons. This was the first of a long series of experiments that Rubbia has performed in the field of weak interactions and which culminated in the Nobel Prize-winning work at CERN.

=== CERN ===
He moved back to Europe for a placement at the University of Rome before joining the newly founded CERN in 1960, where he worked on experiments on the structure of weak interactions. CERN had just commissioned a new type of accelerator, the Intersecting Storage Rings, using counter-rotating beams of protons colliding against each other. Rubbia and his collaborators conducted experiments there, again studying the weak force. The main results in this field were the observation of the structure in the elastic scattering process and the first observation of the charmed baryons. These experiments were crucial in order to perfect the techniques needed later for the discovery of more exotic particles in a different type of particle collider.

In 1976, he suggested adapting CERN's Super Proton Synchrotron (SPS) to collide protons and antiprotons in the same ring – the Proton-Antiproton Collider. Using Simon van der Meers technology of stochastic cooling, the Antiproton Accumulator was also built. The collider started running in 1981 and, in early 1983, an international team of more than 100 physicists headed by Rubbia and known as the UA1 Collaboration, detected the intermediate vector bosons, the W and Z bosons, which had become a cornerstone of modern theories of elementary particle physics long before this direct observation. They carry the weak force that causes radioactive decay in the atomic nucleus and controls the combustion of the Sun, just as photons, massless particles of light, carry the electromagnetic force which causes most physical and biochemical reactions. The weak force also plays a fundamental role in the nucleosynthesis of the elements, as studied in theories of stars evolution. These particles have a mass almost 100 times greater than the proton. In 1984 Carlo Rubbia and Simon van der Meer were awarded the Nobel Prize "for their decisive contributions to the large project, which led to the discovery of the field particles W and Z, communicators of weak interaction".

To achieve energies high enough to create these particles, Rubbia, together with David Cline and Peter McIntyre, proposed a radically new particle accelerator design. They proposed to use a beam of protons and a beam of antiprotons, their antimatter twins, counter-rotating in the vacuum pipe of the accelerator and colliding head-on. The idea of creating particles by colliding beams of more "ordinary" particles was not new: electron-positron and proton-proton colliders were already in use. However, by the late 1970s / early 1980s those could not approach the needed energies in the centre of mass to explore the W/Z region predicted by theory. At those energies, protons colliding with anti-protons were the best candidates, but how to obtain sufficiently intense (and well-collimated) beams of anti-protons, which are normally produced by impinging a beam of protons on a fixed target? Van den Meer had in the meantime developed the concept of "stochastic cooling", in which particles, like anti-protons, could be kept in a circular array, and their beam divergence reduced progressively by sending signals to bending magnets downstream. Since decreasing the divergence of the beam meant to reduce transverse velocity or energy components, the suggestive term "stochastic cooling" was given to the scheme. The scheme could then be used to "cool" (to collimate) the anti-protons, which could thus be forced into a well-focused beam, suitable for acceleration to high energies, without losing too many anti-protons to collisions with the structure. Stochastic expresses the fact that signals to be taken resemble random noise, which was called "Schottky noise" when first encountered in vacuum tubes. Without van der Meer's technique, UA1 would never have had the sufficient high-intensity anti-protons it needed. Without Rubbia's realisation of its usefulness, stochastic cooling would have been the subject of a few publications and nothing else. Simon van de Meer developed and tested the technology in the proton Intersecting Storage Rings at CERN, but it is most effective on rather low-intensity beams, such as the anti-protons which were prepared for use in the SPS when configured as a collider.

=== Harvard University ===
In 1970, Rubbia was appointed Higgins Professor of Physics at Harvard University, where he spent one semester per year for 18 years, while continuing his research activities at CERN. In 1989, he was appointed Director-General of the CERN Laboratory. During his mandate, in 1993, "CERN agreed to allow anybody to use the Web protocol and code free of charge … without any royalty or other constraint".

=== Gran Sasso Laboratory ===
Rubbia has also been one of the leaders in a collaboration effort deep in the Gran Sasso Laboratory, designed to detect any sign of decay of the proton. The experiment seeks evidence that would disprove the conventional belief that matter is stable. The most widely accepted version of the unified field theories predicts that protons do not last forever, but gradually decay into energy after an average lifetime of at least 10^{32} years. The same experiment, known as ICARUS and based on a new technique of electronic detection of ionizing events in ultra-pure liquid argon, is aiming at the direct detection of the neutrinos emitted from the Sun, a first rudimentary neutrino telescope to explore neutrino signals of cosmic nature. Rubbia further proposed the concept of an energy amplifier, a novel and safe way of producing nuclear energy exploiting present-day accelerator technologies, which is actively being studied worldwide in order to incinerate high-activity waste from nuclear reactors, and produce energy from natural thorium and depleted uranium. In 2013 he proposed building a large number of small-scale thorium power plants.

=== Other organisational affiliations ===
Rubbia was principal Scientific Adviser of CIEMAT (Spain), a member of the high-level Advisory Group on global warming set up by EU's President Barroso in 2007 and of the board of trustees at the IMDEA Energy Institute. In 2009–2010, he was Special Adviser for Energy to the Secretary General of ECLAC, the United Nations Economic Commission for Latin America, based in Santiago (Chile). In June 2010, Rubbia was appointed Scientific Director of the Institute for Advanced Sustainability Studies in Potsdam (Germany). He is a member of the Italy-USA Foundation. During his term as President of ENEA (1999–2005) he promoted a novel method for concentrating solar power at high temperatures for energy production, known as the Archimede Project, which is being developed by industry for commercial use.

== Personal life ==
Rubbia has two children from his wife Marisa. Rubbia is openly a Christian believer, as he stated in his 1987 book The Temptation to Believe. He is also a member of the Pontifical Academy of Sciences.

== Awards and honours ==
In December 1984, Rubbia was nominated Cavaliere di Gran Croce OMRI. On 30 August 2013, Rubbia was appointed to the Senate of Italy as a Senator for Life by President Giorgio Napolitano. On 8 January 2016, he was awarded with the International Scientific and Technological Cooperation Award by the People's Republic of China. Asteroid 8398 Rubbia is named in his honour. He was elected a Foreign Member of the Royal Society (ForMemRS) in 1984. Also in 1984, Rubbia received the Golden Plate Award of the American Academy of Achievement.

Preceded by Herwig Schopper	CERN Director General; 1989 – 1993	Succeeded by Christopher Llewellyn Smith
