= Intersecting Storage Rings =

Particle accelerator at CERN, Switzerland

Coordinates: 46°14′05″N 6°02′35″E

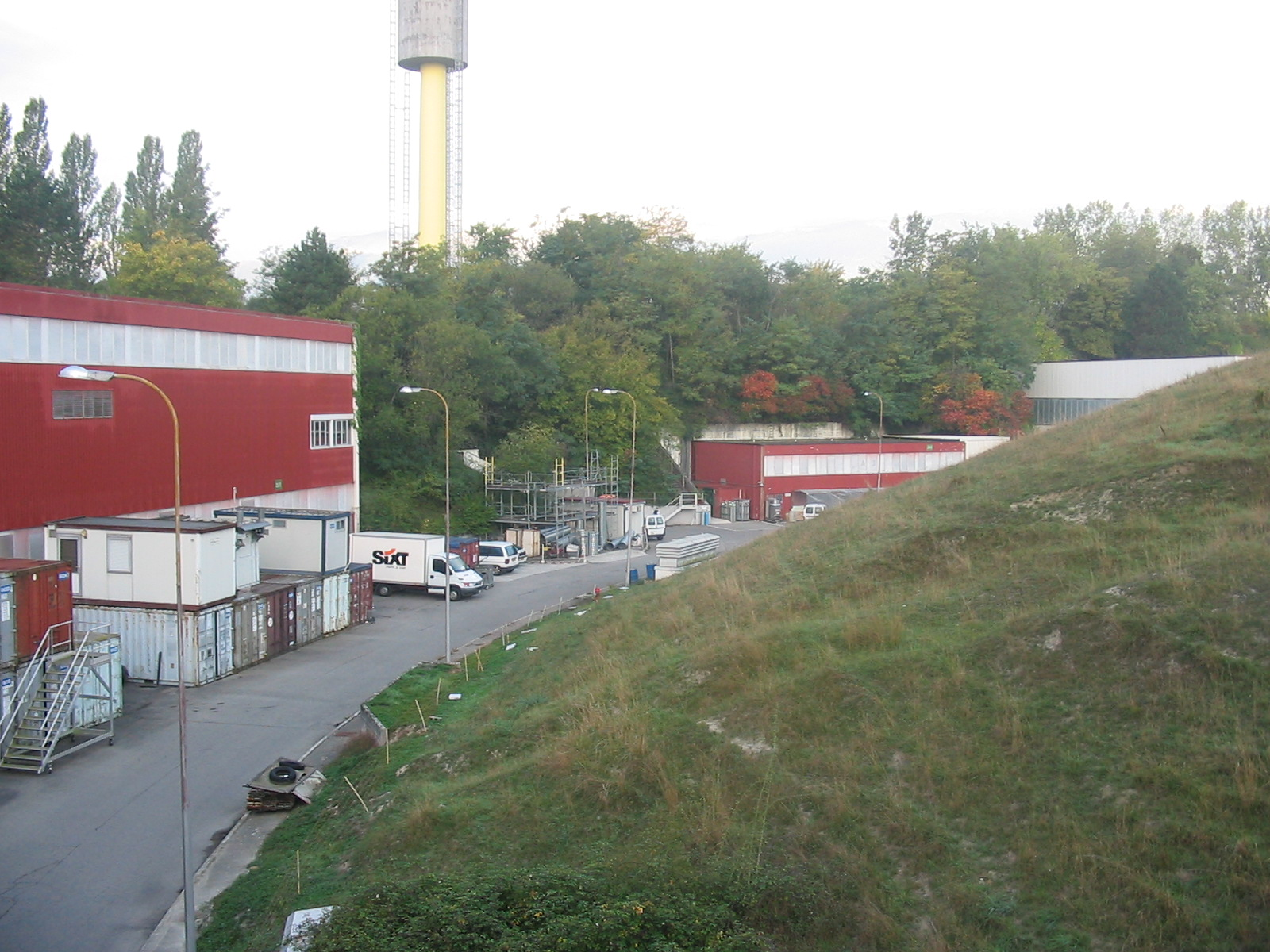
Some of the buildings associated with the ISR at CERN, Geneva. The accelerator itself is beneath the curved, tree-covered hill that runs around the outside of the road.

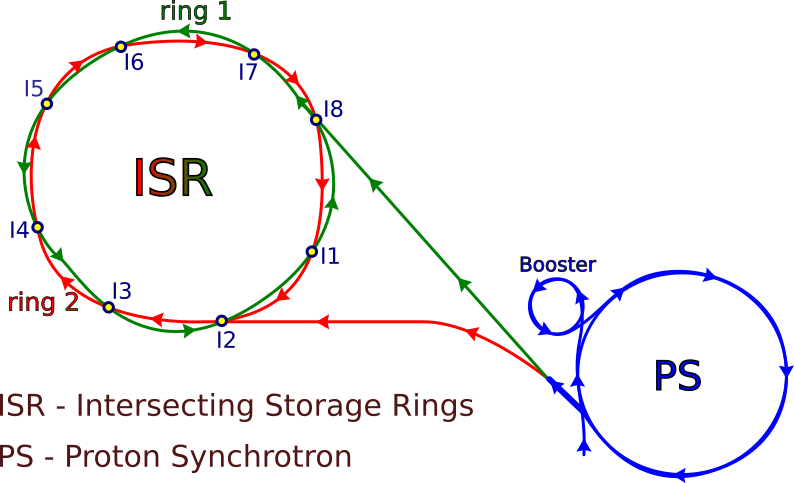
Intersecting Storage Rings

The ISR (standing for "Intersecting Storage Rings") was a particle accelerator at CERN. It was the world's first hadron collider, and ran from 1971 to 1984, with a maximum center of mass energy of 62 GeV. From its initial startup, the collider itself had the capability to produce particles like the J/ψ and the upsilon, as well as observable jet structure; however, the particle detector experiments were not configured to observe events with large momentum transverse to the beamline, leaving these discoveries to be made at other experiments in the mid-1970s. Nevertheless, the construction of the ISR involved many advances in accelerator physics, including the first use of stochastic cooling, and it held the record for luminosity at a hadron collider until surpassed by the Tevatron in 2004.

== History ==
The ISR was proposed in 1964 for conducting the head-on proton-proton collisions at a beam energy of 28 GeV; to the study of the new particles created in such collisions. The project was approved within a year.

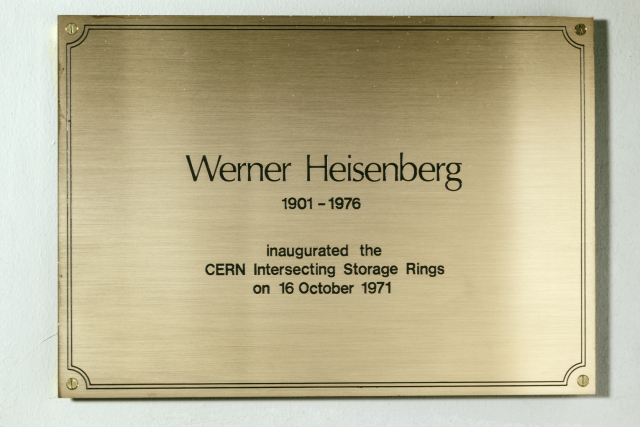
A memorial of Werner Heisenberg and of ISR inauguration

The idea of colliding beams was first conceived by a group at Midwestern Universities Research Association (MURA) in the United States, as a way to have collisions at an increased center of mass energy. The MURA group also invented radiofrequency (RF) stacking technique to accumulate the proton beams of sufficient intensity. CERN Council looked into this novel idea in 1957, and an Accelerator Research (AR) group was established to look into the possibilities of having such a facility. AR studied the two-way fixed-field alternating gradient (FFAG) accelerator for plasma acceleration and for an electron collider. In 1960 when the construction of the Proton Synchrotron was completed, the AR group focussed on a proton-proton collider. To check the feasibility and yield of the RF stacking method, the CERN Electron Storage and Accumulation Ring (CESAR) on a smaller scale compared to ISR, was proposed in 1960 and successfully tested by 1964; followed by the official proposal of ISR in the same year, when the AR group presented the technical design report.

In 1971 itself, detectors were set up by 12 experimental teams at five intersecting points of ISR.

The combination of the CERN Proton Synchrotron (CPS) and ISR also enabled the study of collisions using particles other than the proton, such as the deuteron, alpha particles, and antiprotons.

The initial goal and motivation for ISR was the following.

1. Finding the proton-proton cross-section for 23–54 GeV energy in the center of mass frame.
2. Study of the elastic proton-proton scattering.
3. Obtaining production spectra of particles like pions and kaons.
4. Search for new particles.

During the end stages of ISR, the beam energies were hiked up to a maximum value of 31.4 GeV.

== Accelerator ==
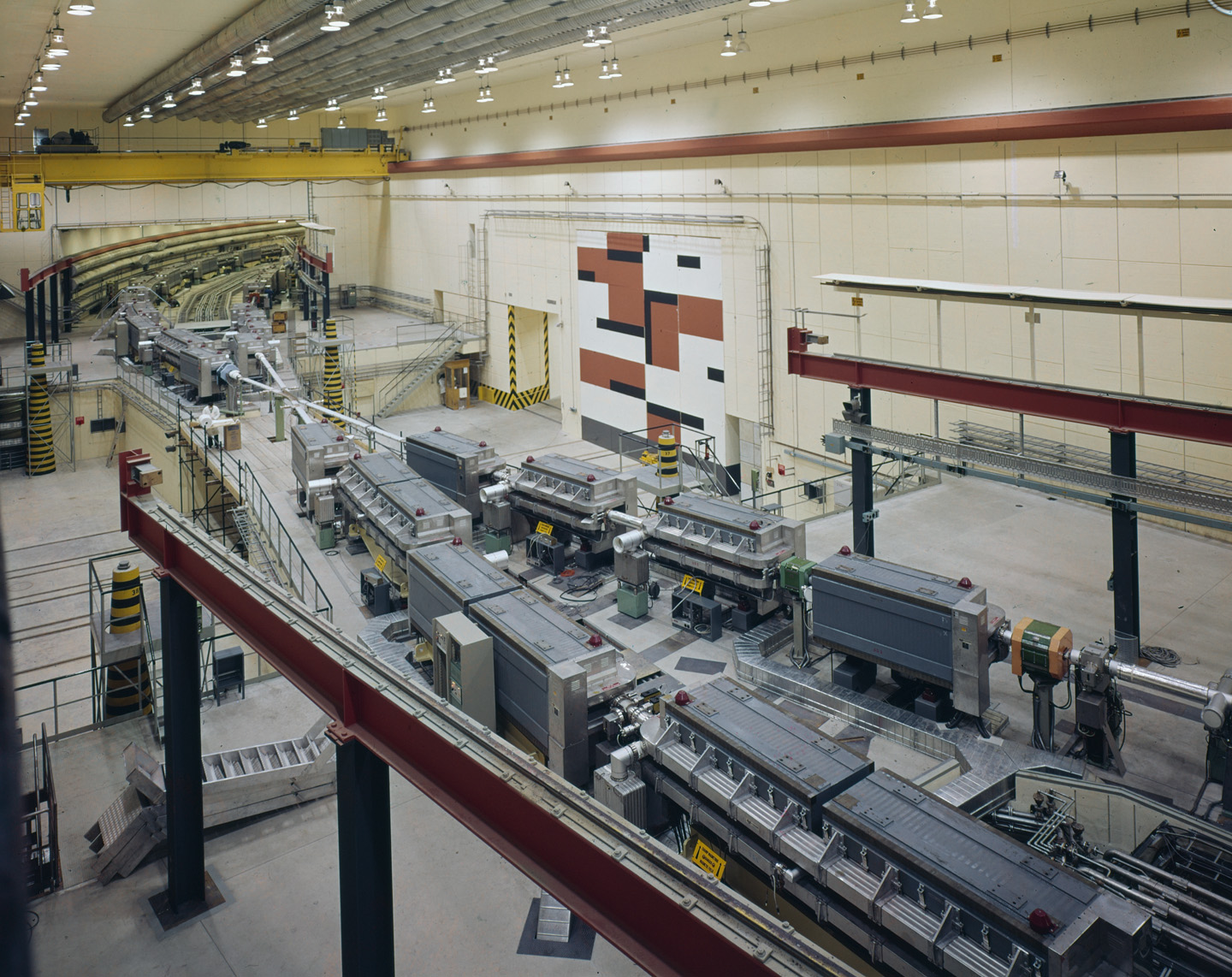
The I4 intersection point at the ISR, which hosted the Split Field Magnet Detector

The accelerator was made up of two magnetic rings (located in France), each with a circumference of 942m. The rings interlaced together such that they would meet at eight intersecting regions for colliding proton beams. The 28 GeV proton beams would come from the CERN Proton Synchrotron (CPS) located about 200 meters away (In Switzerland)

=== Major leaps in accelerator technology ===
==== RF stacking ====
CERN Electron Storage and Accumulation Ring (CESAR) and later ISR were among the first colliders to utilize the RF beam stacking method to increase intensity. In the previous years, the construction of hadron colliders was avoided as it appeared to be unfruitful due to the unavailability of any stacking method. Since ISR, every other collider has utilized the RF stacking method.

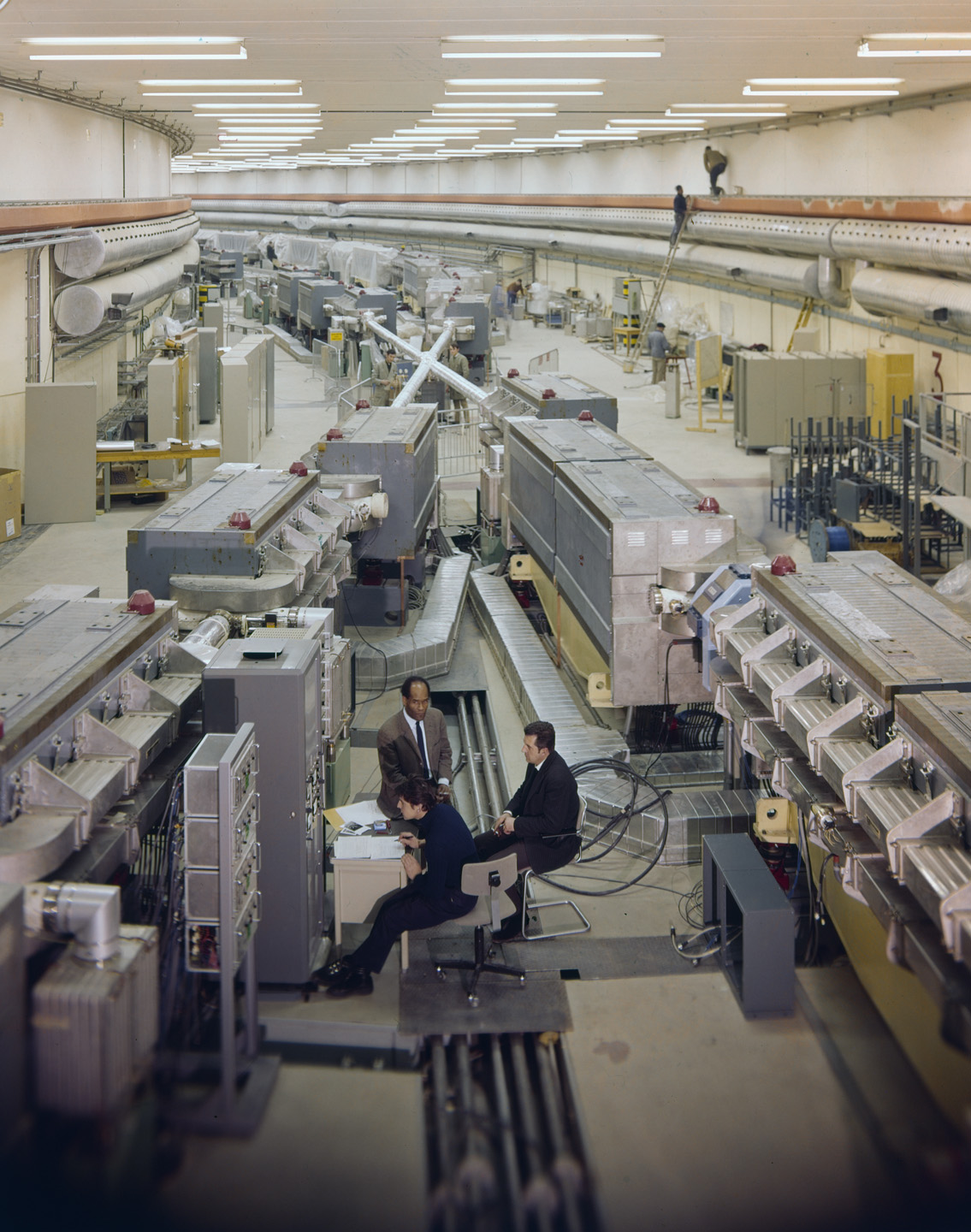

==== Schottky noise and stochastic beam cooling ====
Schottky noise is a signal generated by a finite number of randomly distributed particles in a beam. In 1972 Wolfgang Schnell found the longitudinal and transverse Schottky noise signals at ISR. This made it evident that stochastic beam damping was possible. And brought up a new window for non-invasive beam diagnostics and the need to have an active cooling system for reducing the size and momentum spread of the beam. The Schottky signals gave a precise description of how the density of the beam stack varied with betatron frequency. After demonstrating the damping of betatron oscillations, stochastic cooling of the antiprotons beams was widely used to enhance luminosities in proton-antiproton collisions. After ISR, the proton-antiproton collider at Super Proton Synchrotron employed the same technique for increasing luminosities, so did the other colliders such as Tevatron.

==== Thin-walled vacuum chambers ====
ISR group designed and set-up very large thin-walled vacuum chambers at the intersecting points where detectors were set up. These were made up of tin and titanium and inspired the future vacuum chambers.

==== Detector magnets ====
The superconducting solenoid installed at Intersection-1, the Open Axial Field Magnet installed at Intersection-8 and an Air-cored Toroid at Intersection-6, were state-of-the-art magnetic detector systems developed by ISR teams. Almost all collider detectors are now based on larger and improved versions of basic principles of magnetic detectors put forth by ISR.

== See also ==
- Timeline of particle discoveries
- Roman pot
