= Proton Synchrotron =

CERN's first synchrotron accelerator

CERN Complex

Current particle and nuclear facilities
- LHC: Accelerates protons and heavy ions
- LEIR: Accelerates ions
- SPS: Accelerates protons and ions
- PSB: Accelerates protons
- PS: Accelerates protons or ions
- Linac 3: Injects heavy ions into LEIR
- Linac4: Accelerates ions
- AD: Decelerates antiprotons
- ELENA: Decelerates antiprotons
- ISOLDE: Produces radioactive ion beams
- MEDICIS: Produces isotopes for medical purposes

The Proton Synchrotron (PS, sometimes also referred to as CPS) is a particle accelerator at CERN. It is CERN's first synchrotron, beginning its operation in 1959. For a brief period the PS was the world's highest energy particle accelerator. It has since served as a pre-accelerator for the Intersecting Storage Rings (ISR) and the Super Proton Synchrotron (SPS), and is currently part of the Large Hadron Collider (LHC) accelerator complex. In addition to protons, PS has accelerated alpha particles, oxygen and sulfur nuclei, electrons, positrons, and antiprotons.

Today, the PS is part of CERN's accelerator complex. It accelerates protons for the LHC as well as a number of other experimental facilities at CERN. Using a negative hydrogen ion source, the ions are first accelerated to the energy of 160 MeV in the linear accelerator Linac 4. The hydrogen ion is then stripped of both electrons, leaving only the nucleus containing one proton, which is injected into the Proton Synchrotron Booster (PSB), which accelerates the protons to 2 GeV, followed by the PS, which pushes the beam to 25 GeV. The protons are then sent to the Super Proton Synchrotron, and accelerated to 450 GeV before they are injected into the LHC. The PS also accelerates heavy ions from the Low Energy Ion Ring (LEIR) at an energy of 72 MeV, for collisions in the LHC.

== Background ==
The synchrotron (as in Proton Synchrotron) is a type of cyclic particle accelerator, descended from the cyclotron, in which the accelerating particle beam travels around a fixed path. The magnetic field which bends the particle beam into its fixed path increases with time, and is synchronized to the increasing energy of the particles. As the particles travels around the fixed circular path they will oscillate around their equilibrium orbit, a phenomenon called betatron oscillations.

In a conventional synchrotron the focusing of the circulating particles is achieved by weak focusing: the magnetic field that guides the particles around the fixed radius decreases slightly with radius, causing the orbits of the particles with slightly different positions to approximate each other. The amount of focusing in this way is not very great, and consequently the amplitudes of the betatron oscillations are large. Weak focusing requires a large vacuum chamber, and consequently big magnets. Most of the cost of a conventional synchrotron is the magnets. The PS was the first accelerator at CERN that made use of the alternating-gradient principle, also called strong focusing: quadrupole magnets are used to alternately focus horizontally and vertically many times around the circumference of the accelerator. The focusing of the particle can in theory become as strong as one wishes, and the amplitude of the betatron oscillations as small as desired. The net result is that you can reduce the cost of the magnets.

== Operational history ==
=== Preliminary studies ===
When early in the 1950s the plans for a European laboratory of particle physics began to take shape, two different accelerator projects emerged. One machine was to be of standard type, easy and relatively fast and cheap to build: the synchrocyclotron, achieving collisions at a center-of-mass energy of 600 MeV. The second device was a much more ambitious undertaking: an accelerator bigger than any other then existing, a synchrotron that could accelerate protons up to an energy of 10 GeV – the PS.

By May 1952 a design group was set up with Odd Dahl in charge. Other members of the group were among others Rolf Widerøe, Frank Kenneth Goward, and John Adams. After a visit to the Cosmotron at Brookhaven National Laboratory in the US, the group learnt of a new idea for making cheaper and higher energy machines: alternating-gradient focusing. The idea was so attractive that the study of a 10 GeV synchrotron was dropped, and a study of a machine implementing the new idea initiated. Using this principle a 30 GeV accelerator could be built for the same cost as a 10 GeV accelerator using weak focusing. However, the stronger focusing the higher a precision of alignment of magnets required. This proved a serious problem in the construction of the accelerator.

A second problem in the construction period was the machines behavior at an energy called "transition energy". At this point the relative increase in particle velocity changes from being greater to being smaller, causing the amplitude of the betatron oscillation to go to zero and loss of stability in the beam. This was solved by a jump, or a sudden shift in the acceleration, in which pulsed quadruples made the protons traverse the transition energy level much faster.

The PS was approved in October 1953, as a synchrotron of 25 GeV energy with a radius of 72 meter, and a budget of 120 million Swiss franc. The focusing strength chosen required a vacuum chamber of 12 cm width and 8 cm height, with magnets of about 4000 tonnes total mass. Dahl resigned as head of the project in October 1954 and was replaced by John Adams. By August 1959 the PS was ready for its first beam, and on 24 of November the machine reached a beam energy of 24 GeV.

=== 1960–1976: Fixed-target and pre-accelerator to ISR ===
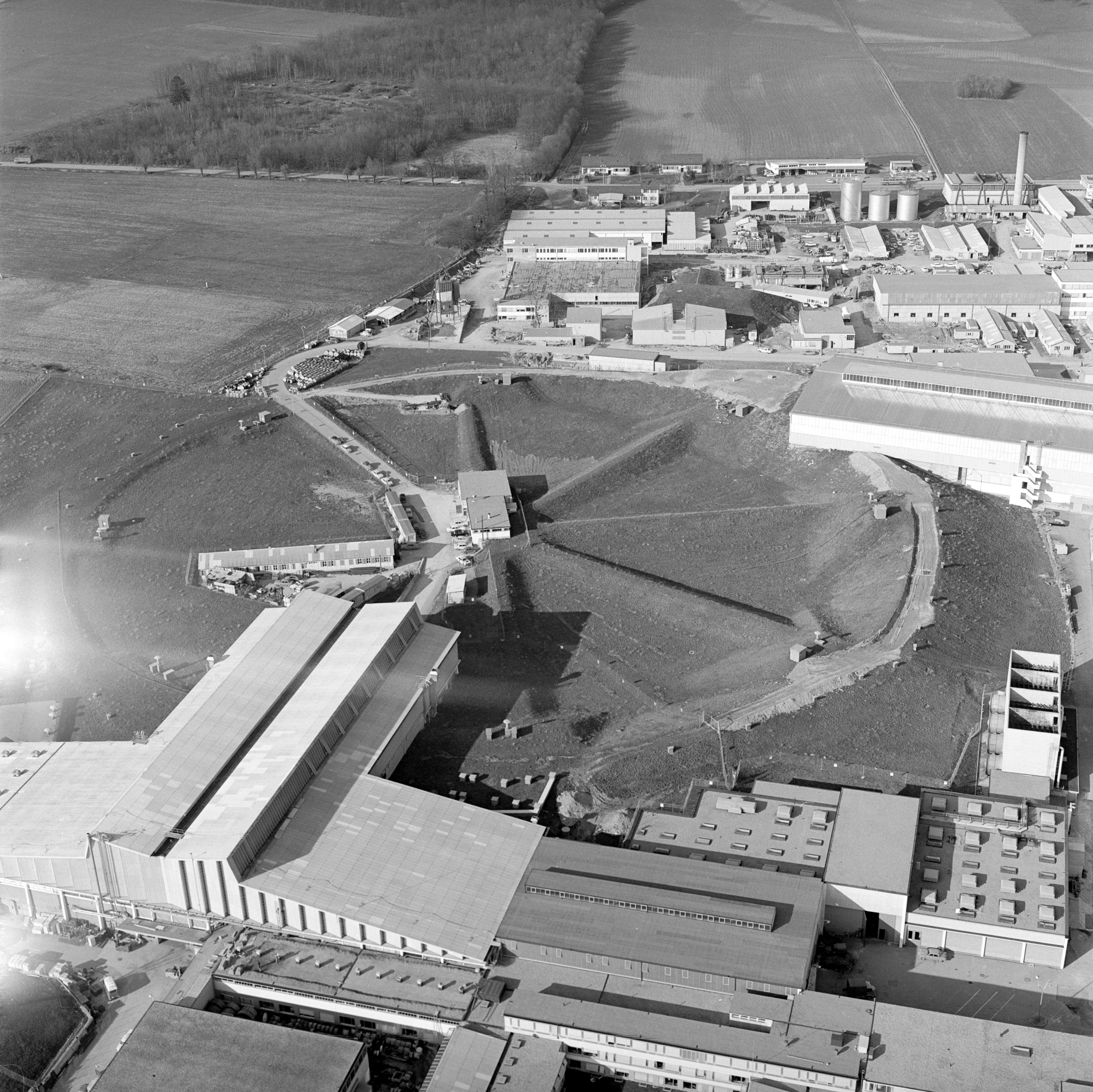
Aerial view of the 28 GeV Proton Synchrotron. The underground ring of the 28 GeV proton synchrotron in 1965. Left, the South and North experimental halls. Top right, part of the East hall. Bottom right, the main generator room and the cooling condensers.

By the end of 1965 the PS was the center of a spider's web of beam lines: It supplied protons to the South Hall (Meyrin site) where an internal target produced five secondary beams, serving a neutrino experiment and a muon storage ring; the North Hall (Meyrin site) where two bubble chambers (80 cm hydrogen Saclay, heavy liquid CERN) were fed by an internal target; when the East Hall (Meyrin site) became available in 1963, protons from the PS hit an internal target producing a secondary beam filtered by electrostatic separators to the CERN 2 m bubble chamber and additional experiments.

Together with the construction of the Intersecting Storage Rings (ISR), an improvement program for the PS was decided in 1965, also making space for the Gargamelle and the Big European Bubble Chamber experiments. The injection energy of the PS was raised by constructing an 800 MeV four ring booster — the Proton Synchrotron Booster (PSB) — which became operational in 1972.

=== 1976–1991: Pre-accelerator to SPS/Spp̅S and LEAR ===
In 1976 the Super Proton Synchrotron (SPS) became a new client of the PS. When SPS started to operate as a proton–antiproton collider — the Spp̅S — the PS had the double task of producing an intense 26 GeV/c proton beam for generating antiprotons at 3.5 GeV/c to be stored in the Antiproton Accumulator (AA), and then accelerating the antiprotons to 26 GeV/c for transfer to the SPS.

The linear accelerator, now serving the PSB, was replaced in 1978 by Linac 2, leading to a further increase in intensity. During this period acceleration of light ions entered the scene. Linac 1, which was replaced by Linac 2, was equipped to accelerate deuterons that were accelerated in the PS, and transferred to the ISR where they collided with protons or deuterons.

When the Low Energy Antiproton Ring (LEAR), for deceleration and storage of antiprotons, became operational in 1982, PS resumed the new role of an antiproton decelerator. It decelerated antiprotons from the AA to 180 MeV, and injected them into LEAR. During this period the PS complex truly earned its nickname of "versatile particle factory". Up to 1996, PS would regularly accelerate ions for SPS fixed-target experiments, protons for the East Hall or antiproton production at AA, decelerate protons for LEAR, and later accelerate electrons and positrons for the Large Electron–Positron Collider (LEP).

=== 1991–2001: Pre-accelerator to LEP ===
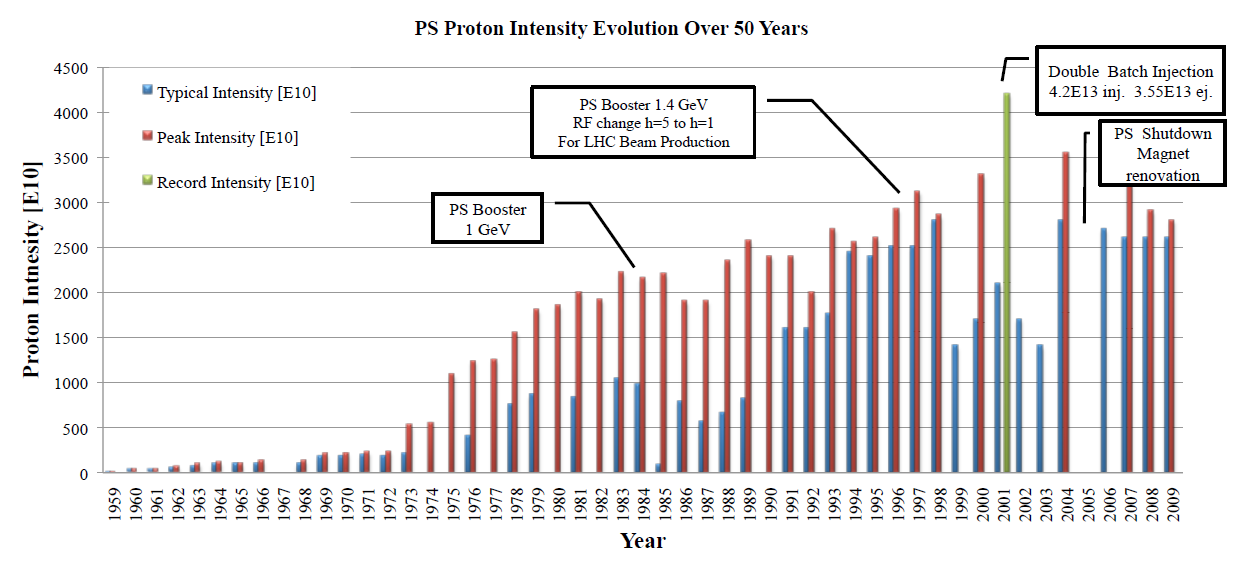
During its long operation the PS has increased its proton density many times

To provide leptons to LEP, three more machines had to be added to the PS complex: LIL-V electron linear accelerator, the LIL-W electron and positron linear accelerator, and the EPA (Electron-Positron Accumulator) storage ring. A modest amount of additional hardware had to be added to modify PS from a 25 GeV proton synchrotron to a 3.5 GeV lepton synchrotron.

During this period the demand for heavier ions to be delivered as a primary beam to the SPS North experimental hall (Prévessin site) also increased. Both sulfur and oxygen ions were accelerated with great success.

=== 2001–today: Pre-accelerator to LHC ===
After the end of operation as a LEP injector, the PS started a new period of operation in preparation as LHC injector and for new fixed-target experiments. New experiments started running in the East area, such as the CLOUD experiment. The PS complex was also remodeled when the AA area was replaced by the Antiproton Decelerator and its experimental area.

By increasing the energy of the PSB and the Linac 2, the PS achieved record intensities in 2000 and 2001. During the whole of 2005 PS was shut down: radiation damage had caused aging of the main magnets. The magnets, originally estimated to have a lifetime of less than 10 years, had exceeded the estimate by more than a factor of four, and went through a refurbishment program. The tunnel was emptied, magnets refurbished, and the machine realigned. In 2008 PS started operating as a pre-accelerator to the LHC. Simultaneously the ion operation changed: LEAR was converted into a storage ring — the Low Energy Ion Ring (LEIR) — and the PSB stopped being an ion injector.

== Construction and operation ==
The PS is built in a tunnel, in which temperature is controlled to ± 1°. Around the circumference, 628 meters, there are 100 magnet units of 4.4 m nominal length, 80 short straight sectors of 1.6 m, and 20 straight sectors of 3 m. Sixteen long straight sections are equipped with acceleration cavities, 20 short ones with quadrupole correction lenses, and 20 short ones with sets of sextupole lenses. Other straight sections are reserved for beam observation stations and injection devices, targets, and ejection magnets.

As the alignment of the magnets is of paramount importance, the units are mounted on a free floating ring of concrete, 200 meters in diameter. As a further precaution, the concrete ring has steel pipes cast in it, where water passes through the ring to keep a constant temperature in the magnets.

== Findings and discoveries ==
Using a neutrino beam produced by a proton beam from PS, the Gargamelle experiment discovered neutral currents in 1973.
