= Stochastic cooling =

Particle beam cooling mechanism

Stochastic cooling is a form of particle-beam cooling. It is used in some particle accelerators and storage rings to control the emittance of the particle beams in the machine. This process uses the electrical signals that the individual charged particles generate in a feedback loop to reduce the tendency of individual particles to move away from the other particles in the beam.

The technique was invented and applied at the Intersecting Storage Rings, and later the Super Proton Synchrotron (SPS), at CERN in Geneva, Switzerland, by Simon van der Meer, a physicist from the Netherlands. It was used to collect and cool antiprotons—these particles were injected into the Proton-Antiproton Collider, a modification of the SPS, with counter-rotating protons and collided at a particle-physics experiment. For this work, van der Meer was awarded the Nobel Prize in Physics in 1984. He shared this prize with Carlo Rubbia of Italy, who proposed the Proton-Antiproton Collider. This experiment discovered the W and Z bosons, fundamental particles that carry the weak nuclear force.

Before the shutdown of the Tevatron on the 30 September 2011, Fermi National Accelerator Laboratory used stochastic cooling in its antiproton source. The accumulated antiprotons were sent to the Tevatron to collide with protons at two collision points: the CDF and the D0 experiment.

Stochastic cooling in the Tevatron at Fermilab was attempted, but was not fully successful. The equipment was subsequently transferred to Brookhaven National Laboratory, where it was successfully used in a longitudinal cooling system in RHIC, operationally used beginning in 2006. Since 2012, RHIC has 3D operational stochastic cooling, that is, cooling of the horizontal, vertical, and longitudinal planes.

== Technical details ==
Stochastic cooling uses the electrical signals produced by individual particles in a group of particles (called a "bunch" of particles) to drive an electromagnetic device, usually an electric kicker, that will kick the bunch of particles to reduce the wayward momentum of that one particle. These individual kicks are applied continuously, and over an extended time, the average tendency of the particles to have wayward momenta is reduced. These cooling times range from a second to several minutes, depending on the depth of the cooling required.

Stochastic cooling is used to narrow the transverse momentum distribution within a bunch of charged particles in a storage ring by detecting fluctuations in the momentum of the bunch and applying a correction (a "steering pulse" or "kick"). This is an application of negative feedback. This is known as "cooling", as the kinetic energy of particles is related to their internal temperature: the faster the particles are moving, the higher the temperature. If the average momentum of the bunch were to be subtracted from the momentum of each particle, then the charged particles would appear to move randomly, much like the molecules in a gas.

The charged particles travel in bunches in potential wells that keep them stable. While the overall motion of a bunch can be damped (reduced) using standard radio-frequency equipment, the internal momentum distribution of each bunch cannot. This can instead be accomplished by stochastic cooling, which aims to slow down individual particles within each bunch using electromagnetic radiation.

The bunches pass through a wideband optical scanner, which detects the positions of the individual particles. In a synchrotron, the transverse motion of the particles can be easily damped by synchrotron radiation, which has a short pulse length and covers a broad range of frequencies, but the longitudinal (forward and backward) motion requires other devices, such as a free-electron laser. To achieve cooling, the position information is fed back into the particle bunches (using, for example, a fast kicker magnet), producing a negative feedback loop that stabilizes their motion.

- Micro-structure of the coupler.
  - Klystron cavity
  - For transversal cooling the same devices are used as in an oscilloscope or in a streak camera
  - Directional couplers, that integrate measurement and steering adjustment (in this context often called kicking) in one device. Coupled energy increases with the square of the length of the structure due to reapplying the field to the particle. The particles travel near but not exactly at light-speed, so the devices are need to slow down the light.
    - traveling wave tube
    - undulator
    - For transverse cooling multiple steering plates and coils connected to form a delay line can be used
- Macro-structure for the pickup. Coupled energy increases linearly with of the length of the structure.
  - Cherenkov radiation. The signals from multiple elements of the microstructure are added before being fed to the amplifier, reducing noise.
  - Multiple devices tuned (narrow band=lower noise) to different frequencies are used, so that about 20 GHz can be covered.

The bunches are focused through a small hole between the electrode structure, so that the devices have access to the near-field of the radiation. Additionally, the current impinging on the electrode is measured, and based on this information, the electrodes are centered on the beam and moved together while the beams cools and gets smaller.

The word "stochastic" in the title stems from the fact that usually only some of the particles can unambiguously be addressed at once. Instead, small groups of particles are addressed within each bunch, and the adjustment or kick applies to the average momentum of each group. The smaller the group of particles which can be detected and adjusted at once (requiring higher bandwidth), the faster the cooling.

As the particles in the storage ring travel at nearly the speed of light, the feedback loop, in general, has to wait until the bunch returns to make the correction. The detector and the kicker can be placed on different positions on the ring with appropriately chosen delays to match the eigenfrequencies of the ring.

The cooling is more efficient for long bunches, as the position spread between particles is longer. Optimally, bunches are as short as possible in the accelerators of the ring and as long as possible in the coolers. Devices which do this are intuitively called stretcher and compressor, or buncher and debuncher. (The links point to the equivalent devices for light pulses; the prisms in the link are functionally replaced by dipole magnets in a particle accelerator.)

In low-energy rings, the bunches can be overlapped with freshly created and thus cool (1000 K) electron bunches from a linac. This is a direct coupling to a lower-temperature bath, which also cools the beam. Afterwards the electrons can also be analyzed and stochastic cooling applied.

== Optical stochastic cooling ==
While stochastic cooling has been very successful, its application is limited to beams with a low number of particles per bunch. Optical stochastic cooling (OSC) was proposed in 1993 to increase the cooling bandwidth. By using visible wavelengths instead of microwave wavelengths, OSC promises 4 orders of magnitude increase in cooling bandwidth from that of stochastic cooling. In transit-time OSC, developed in 1994, a particle first produces a wave-packet in a pickup undulator (PU). The wave-packet and particle are separately transported to a downstream kicker undulator (KU). Here, the wave-packet is used to give a corrective energy kick back to the particle. The sign and magnitude of the energy kick depends on the relative arrival times of the particle and the wave-packet. The light and particle paths must be tuned such that the reference particle is not kicked.

In August 2022, optical stochastic cooling was demonstrated for the first time at Fermilab.

== See also ==
- Electron cooling
