= CERN & Society Foundation =

Swiss foundation in Geneva

- Abbreviation: CSF
- Formation: 2014
- Founder: CERN
- Type: Foundation
- Registration no.: CHE-433.612.330
- Legal status: Foundation
- Headquarters: Meyrin, Geneva
- Location: Canton of Geneva
- President: Jean-Marc Triscone (since 2026)
- Key people: Barbara Solich (Head of Fundraising & Partnerships)
- Website: cernandsocietyfoundation.cern

The CERN & Society Foundation, formally registered in Switzerland as Fondation CERN & Société, is a philanthropic foundation established by the European Organization for Nuclear Research (CERN) in 2014 to connect science with society. In 2018, the foundation merged with the Foundation for the Globe of Science and Innovation.

== Methods ==
The foundation was established to support and promote the mission of CERN and disseminate its benefits to the wider public. It raises funds for projects across the three pillars Education and Outreach, Innovation and Knowledge Exchange, and Culture and Creativity. The foundation receives donations from individuals, companies, trusts and organizations across the world in accordance with CERN's policy for ethical fundraising. The CERN & Society Foundation Board provides strategic advice and guidance, while the day-to-day activities are coordinated by the CERN Fundraising & Partnerships Unit.

== Activities ==
Examples of projects within the different pillars are:

=== Education and outreach ===
- Beamline for Schools (BL4S) competition: a global competition for high school students to design an experiment they would like to perform on the beamline of a particle accelerator.
- CERN Festival Programme: Workshops, science shows and talks which travel around music festivals each summer.
- CERN-Solvay Camp: Educational camp at CERN for high school students from around the world, in partnership with Solvay.
- ENLIGHT Training: Training in hadron therapy through the European Network for Light Ion Hadron Therapy.
- The Globe of Science and Innovation: structure that can be rented as an events space.
- CERN National Teacher Programmes: School science teachers from around the world complete teacher training at CERN.
- Non-Member State Summer Student Programme: Students from non-member states are supported to attend the CERN Summer Student Programme.
- Non-Member State PhD Studentship: Doctoral students can complete research on each LHC experiment, as well as the Future Circular Collider (FCC).
- Public events: Programme of events which are open to the public and free to attend.
- Science Gateway: Public museum with three permanent exhibitions, an auditorium and two education laboratories.

=== Innovation and knowledge exchange ===
- Biology Dynamics Modeller (BioDynaMo): An open-source, agent-based simulation software developed at CERN and Newcastle University.
- CERN-MEDICIS: Produces radionuclides which can be used to treat different kinds of oncological, cardiological and neurological diseases.
- TIMEPIX@school: Bringing particle detector kits into school classrooms.
- Zenodo: Open research repository developed under the European OpenAIRE programme and operated by CERN.

=== Culture and creativity ===
- Arts at CERN: Arts programme of the laboratory; supports artistic residencies at CERN and holds annual arts and science summits.
- Exploring the Unknown: exhibition in the Science Gateway.
