= CERN ritual hoax =

2016 found footage video

Frame from the video depicting people in cloaks gathered around the statue of Shiva

The CERN ritual is a found footage video that depicts an occult ritual occurring in the grounds of CERN, the intergovernmental organization that operates the largest particle physics laboratory in the world. The video became popular in August 2016 and shows several people dressed in black cloaks surrounding a statue of the Hindu deity Shiva and apparently performing a human sacrifice, which suggest that CERN aims to use the Large Hadron Collider (LHC) to create a portal to hell, summon the antichrist, or destroy the universe. The video ended with the person filming crying out and running away.

== Reactions ==
A CERN spokesperson stated that the video was a prank and that no one was actually harmed. CERN stated in its FAQ that the video was "fiction" and the actions were outside its professional guidelines and without any official permission. CERN stated that it "doesn't tolerate this kind of spoof" and that it can "give rise to misunderstandings about the scientific nature of our work".

== Continuation of the hoax ==
In 2024, social media began circulating video recordings of the 2016 Gotthard Base Tunnel opening show Sacre del Gottardo that was produced by Volker Hesse, and promoted it as the opening ceremony for Cern's (LHC). It was again suggested that Cern was attempting to open a portal to hell.

In reality, Switzerland hosted this event as a moment of triumph in transportation and innovation as the tunnel is the world's longest railway and deepest traffic tunnel which was created to be more environmentally friendly and convenient for travelers in the Alpine region. The show displayed an abstract history of the construction of the tunnel exhibiting interpretative dancers in mining uniforms, and later presented several representations of local myths and legends in the region. Some of these mythical visuals did showcase several folkloric demonic cultural themes stemming from in part the local Göschenen village's legend about Schöllenen Gorge's Devil bridge and associated with Gotthard Pass. This legend is a popular genre of ancient to early modern folktales related of several "Devil's Bridges" spread throughout Europe. Additionally, parts of the show featured "mountain demons" associated with other myths in the region.

Reaction's against Hesse's production were mixed. While many praised the production others described the spectacle as odd and bizarre, and did not accurately represent Swiss culture. A number of detractors of the Gotthard Base Tunnel exhibition, have spread an independent conspiracy theory stating that the show was actually a satanic ritual and not an abstract performance, as opposed to the August 2016 Cern ritual hoax which happened two months after the original 2016 Cern ritual hoax. The BBC declared that it was not always possible to describe the ceremony.

In 2024 Cern later reported to Reuters that the recirculated video of Sacre del Gottardo, claiming to be from CERN was in fact not created by CERN.

== See also ==
- Satanic panic
