= The Globe of Science and Innovation =

Museum in the Canton of Geneva, Switzerland

Globe of Science and Innovation
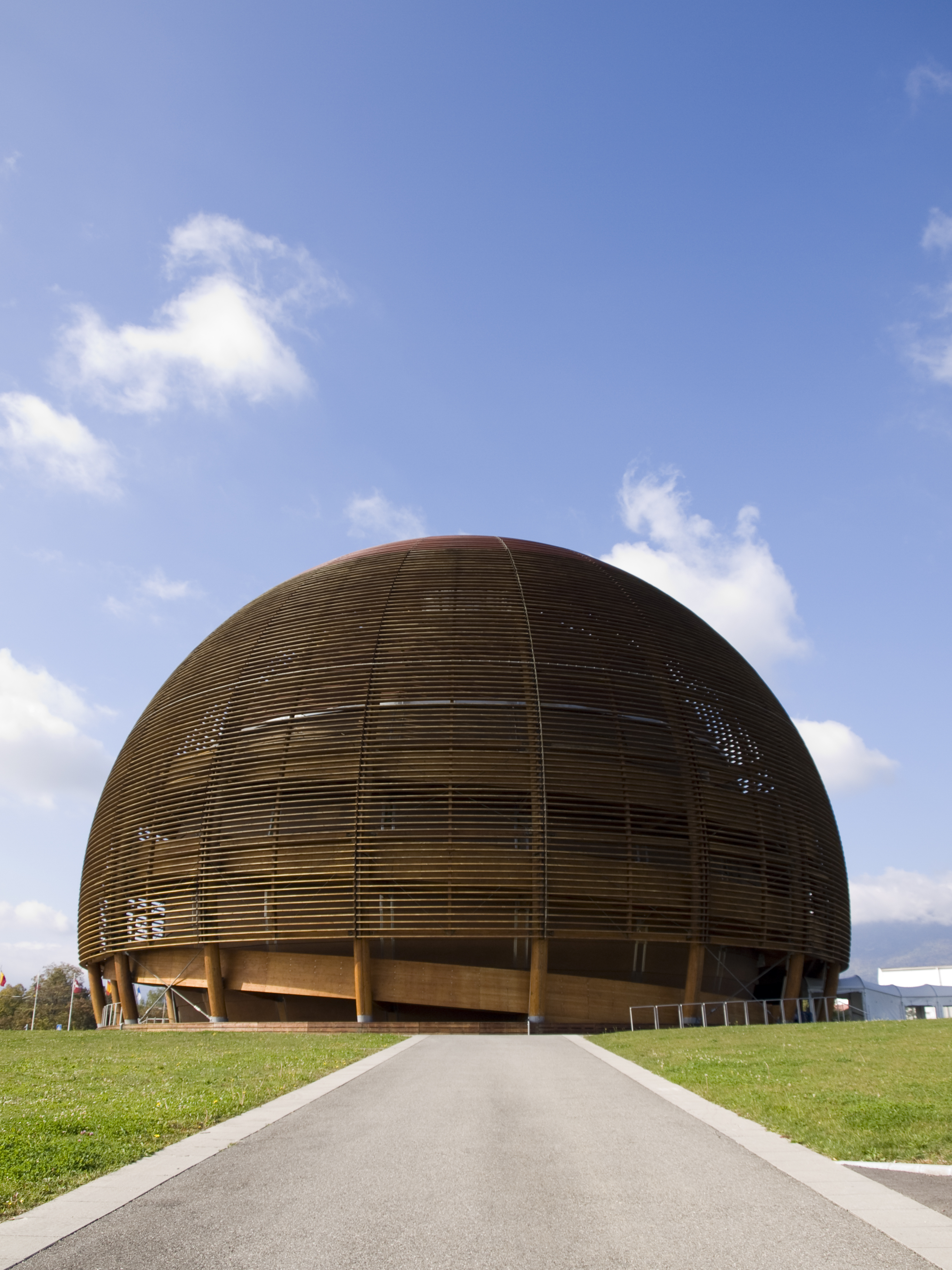

- Location within Switzerland
- Established: 2005
- Location: 385 route de Meyrin – CH 1217 Meyrin
- Coordinates: 46.233889°N 6.055833°E
- Architects: Hervé Dessimoz; Thomas Büchi
- Website: Globe of Science and Innovation

The Globe of Science and Innovation is a visitor center, designed to inform visitors about the significant research being carried out at CERN. The wooden structure, which is 27 metres (89 ft) high and 40 metres (130 ft) in diameter, is a symbol of planet earth and was originally built for Expo.02 in Neuchâtel, Switzerland. In 2004, it was moved to its current location in Meyrin in the Canton of Geneva, Switzerland.

== History of the Globe ==
The globe started life as the Palais de l'Equilibre at Expo.02 in Neuchâtel, Switzerland. It was designed by Geneva architects, Hervé Dessimoz and Thomas Büchi, as a model of sustainable building. It is 27 metres (89 ft) high and 40 metres (130 ft) in diameter, roughly the size of the dome of St. Peter's Basilica in Rome. The globe consists of two concentric spheres nested within one another, made up of five different types of timber: Scotch pine, Douglas pine, spruce, larch, and Canadian maple. The outer shell is composed of wooden slats, and two ramps run between the two spheres, allowing visitors to see out. The inner sphere is made of 18 wooden arches, covered by wooden panels; this forms the walls of the globe's interior. This construction model enables the globe to act as a natural carbon sink.

After Expo.02 was closed, the Swiss Confederation donated the Palais de l'Equilibre to CERN, and it was renamed the Globe of Science and Innovation. It was moved and re-opened in 2004, in time for the 50th anniversary of CERN. In 2010, the globe was renovated and its new, permanent exhibit, Universe of Particles, was opened.

The Globe hosts CERN, private and public events on a regular basis. Between 2007 and 2018 the operations were financed through the Foundation for the Globe of Science and Innovation. The foundation was then merged with the CERN & Society Foundation that since has raises funds for the activities.

== Exhibitions ==
The Universe of Particles exhibition has permanently closed after the inauguration of the Science Gateway, hosting three new interactive exhibitions. In October 2024, the first temporary exhibition on the ground floor of the Globe opened, which is a collaboration between CERN and the Natural History Museum of Geneva.

=== Second floor ===
The second floor, which is reached by a third walking ramp, is a high-ceiling multipurpose space that is used for events such as lectures, films, and press conferences. The walls along the ramp tell the story of the universe from Big Bang to the present day.
