= Decay (2012 film) =

- Directed by: Luke Thompson
- Written by: Luke Thompson
- Produced by: Michael Mazur; Luke Thompson; Burton DeWilde
- Starring: Zoë Hatherell; Tom Procter; Stewart Martin-Haugh; Sara Mahmoud; William P.Martin
- Cinematography: Burton DeWilde
- Edited by: Burton DeWilde
- Music by: Tom McLaughlan
- Production company: H2ZZ Productions
- Release date: 29 November 2012
- Running time: 75 minutes
- Country: United Kingdom
- Language: English
- Budget: $3,225

Decay is a 2012 British independent horror film written and directed by Luke Thompson (of the University of Manchester), set at the Large Hadron Collider in Switzerland. The movie was created on a budget of $3,225 and was filmed over a period of two years by Thompson and his fellow physicists. The film was released online for free under the Creative Commons CC BY-NC license, shareable and remixable. Decay was premiered on 29 November 2012 and centres on the idea of the Large Hadron Collider transforming scientists into zombies.

Thompson, a physics doctoral student, came up with the idea of the film while he was walking through the maintenance tunnels at CERN and began thinking that it would be a good location for a horror movie. In an interview with Wired, he stated that the film was initially started for fun, but that it was also an opportunity to "do some satirical commentary on various aspects of people’s perceptions of science".

== Plot ==
A security guard is walking along the maintenance tunnel of the Large Hadron Collider (LHC) at CERN when he turns around, meets an unidentified man whom he recognizes, and informs him that he is not supposed to be down there. The man proceeds to shoot the guard dead.

Connor, James, Amy, and Matt are physicists at CERN working on the Large Hadron Collider. James works with the LHC while the others analyze its data. They are on their way to attend an emergency meeting at CERN. They have no idea why the meeting was called, but Amy believes it cannot be too significant. At CERN, they overhear Dr. Niven and the Director-General arguing over safety. Dr. Niven wants the LHC stopped until he can assess the safety. The Director-General overrides his concerns and informs him that the LHC would usually work once the problem is fixed and finds the Higgs boson is of utmost importance. The Director-General realizes that Connor, James, and Amy are listening to them, and he asks the security guard to shut the door.

They meet Lisa in the conference room, who was supposed to be in Barcelona but missed her flight due to the party. The Director-General addresses the attendees and informs them that there was a beam dump in LHC the previous night. The beam dump occurred because the beam sensors detected that the monopole magnet at LHC segment 11G had quenched due to an unknown event. He further warns that there could be a catastrophic accident if the event occurs again. Dr. Niven is selected to take a team of technicians down to the LHC tunnel to investigate the cause of the incident and try to get the LHC running again. The Director-General requests four volunteers to be in the control room while Dr. Niven is busy. Connor volunteers for the task, and the Director-General selects Connor, James, Amy, and Lisa. Lisa bails out, informing the Director-General that she has to attend a conference in Barcelona, so Matt is selected instead.

James introduces his girlfriend Kate to Connor, Amy, and Matt. Amy uses the mainframe computer to simulate the impact of Higgs boson radiation on human tissues. As Amy runs the simulations on the mainframe, the LHC beam monitor indicates that the LHC is up and running. James checks the system and realizes that the system has turned on by itself and Amy had nothing to do with it.

The team led by Dr. Niven is still in the LHC maintenance tunnel and is at risk of being exposed to radiation. James and Connor try to shut down the LHC, but they are unsuccessful; the emergency shutdown switch is not working. The radiation alarm goes off, and they decide to run away to avoid exposure to the radiation. The elevator near the control room is not working, and there is no mobile signal since they are over a hundred meters underground. They decide to go down to the maintenance tunnel, and James manually shuts down the LHC. Connor informs the group that the LHC cannot be turned on from the control room, and neither do they have access rights to turn on the LHC. Since the LHC is now off, they can use the elevator in the maintenance tunnel to get out; they believe that the team led by Dr. Niven is dead due to radiation.

As they walk through the maintenance tunnel, they are attacked by the team's technicians led by Dr. Niven, and Kate is captured. Connor, Amy, James, and Matt lock themselves up in a room, and James uses the coolant to scare away the technicians. Amy and Connor realize that the technicians had radiation burn marks on their skin and cannot comprehend how the technicians are still alive. Connor finds another way out of the room, and they head back into the maintenance tunnel, where they find the dead body of the security guard killed at the beginning of the movie. They find the interlock array and see that it has been destroyed, indicating sabotage. The technicians again attack them, so they decide to find a mainframe to contact somebody for help. On their way, they are attacked again, and this time James is bitten.

They finally find the mainframe server room. James wants to check if Kate is still alive. Amy and Connor work on the mainframe consoles to breach the firewall to ask for help but are unsuccessful. Finally, the results of Amy's simulations come up; they indicate that the boson radiation has the capability to destroy the human brain. This makes them realize that the technicians are all dead and have become zombie-like. Amy and James head back into the maintenance tunnel, where they find the Director-General's security guard killed. James recovers a gun from the guard. Finally, they find Kate's dead body, which the zombies have mutilated. Meanwhile, Connor is studying the simulation data when somebody deletes the results. Amy and James return to the mainframe server room, where Connor informs them that only the Director-General has the right to delete the data.

James and Connor manage to unlock all the doors using the mainframe console. Finally, James succumbs to his injury and becomes a zombie, attacking the others. Matt bolts, leaving Connor and Amy to defend themselves. Connor shoots James. Amy and Connor go back to the maintenance tunnel and are attacked by the zombies. Connor is bitten, and Amy shoots him when he turns. Zombies escape the maintenance tunnel through the unlocked doors and attack people outside. Zombies chase Amy, but she manages to elude them. Matt is eaten alive by the zombies.

Amy manages to reach the surface and is chased by the zombies. She goes to Dr. Niven's office to collect data about his simulation to collect evidence against the Director-General. She calls up Lisa on her mobile to inform her that the Director-General is responsible for the deaths at CERN, but she is redirected to her voice mail. The Director-General enters Dr. Niven's office, picks up the gun left behind by Amy, and points it at her. Amy manages to get a confession out of the Director-General; as he is about to pull the trigger, it shows that Amy had not disconnected the call and that the admission has gone to Lisa's voice mail. The screen goes black, and a gunshot is heard.

== Cast ==
- Zoë Hatherell as Amy
- Tom Procter as Connor
- Stewart Martin-Haugh as James
- Sara Mahmoud as Kate
- William P. Martin as Matt
- Eduard Friesen as Director General
- Kurt Rinnert as Dr. Niven
- Jenn Strauss as Lisa

== Production ==
Thompson began filming in 2010 and took two years to complete Decay, with the film's crew having to borrow cameras and create special effects on a limited budget. Although not endorsed by CERN, the organisation gave permission for Decay to be released.

== Release ==
A film trailer was released in the autumn of 2012, with some sites such as Fearnet commenting that while the film did not look particularly good, the premise of Decay was an interesting one.

Decay was released on 8 December 2012 for download and streaming via YouTube and Vimeo.
