= List of CERN Scientific Committees =

Committees of CERN

Proposals for experiments are made at CERN and have to go through the correct channels in order to be approved. One of the last steps in the process is to submit the proposal to an appropriate CERN Scientific Committee. The committees will discuss the proposal and then pass on their recommendations to the Research Board (previously the Nuclear Physics Research Committee) for the final decision. Proposals approved become part of the CERN experimental programme.

In 1960, John Adams, the Director General, created three committees to manage experiments for each bubble chamber experimental technique used at CERN. These replaced the previous Advisory and Bubble Chamber committees. At the end of the bubble chamber period, the system was again changed and based on machine, rather than experimental technique. The committees were changed and merged in order to accommodate to this. Since then, the committees have changed based on the creation and decommissioning of facilities and accelerators.

== Current committees ==
Title	Current Chair	Date Established	Description	Links
ISOLDE and Neutron Time-of-Flight Experiments Committee (INTC)	Marek Pfutzner	August 1999	Evaluates experiment proposals for the ISOLDE facility and n_TOF facility. Initially referred to as ISTC, but changed to INTC in 2000.	Database
Large Hadron Collider Committee (LHCC)	Frank Simon	March 1992	Evaluates experiment proposals for LHC, and reviews the World LHC Computing Grid (WLCG) and detector R&D projects.	Database
Research Board (RB)	Fabiola Gianotti (CERN Director General)	1976	Makes decisions on recommendations made by all CERN Experimental Committees. Also decides on accelerator schedules and "Recognised Experiments" requests.	Database
Super Proton Synchrotron and Proton Synchrotron Committee (SPSC) - 2nd Period	Jordan Nash	1989	Review requests from experimental teams considering the accelerator availability and physics interest.	Database

== Past committees ==
Title	Date Established	Date Ended	Description
Advisory Committee (AC)	June 1957	1960	Advised the Director-General on the utilisation of the accelerators by Member State visiting teams. Taken over by three new experimental committees.
Detector Research and Development Committee (DRDC)	July 1990	January 1995	Evaluated all proposals for detector R&D. Taken over by LHCC and SPSC.
Electronic Experiments Committee (EEC)	March 1961	1976	Examined proposals for experiments concerning electronics at the Proton Synchrotron (PS). Often referred to as Physics I Committee (PH-I-COM). Merged with TCC to become PSC.
Emulsion Experiment Committee (EmC)	1961	1976	Examined proposals for experiments concerning emulsion experiments. Merged with NSC to form PH-III-COM, which then become the SCC.
ISOLDE Committee (ISC)	1991	1999	Reviewed proposals for ISOLDE experiments. Become the ISTC (INTC).
Intersecting Storage Rings Committee (ISRC)	1968	January 1984	Evaluated proposals for experiments using the Intersecting Storage Rings (ISR). Disassembled after the ISR were closed down.
Large Electron Position Committee (LEPC)	1982	November 2000	Reviewed proposals for experiments at the LEP accelerator. Disassembled after LEP was decommissioned.
Nuclear Physics Research Committee (NPRC)	1961	1976	Took recommendations from the committees and decided on the experimental programmes for the facilities. Regularly reviewed the current experiments. Replaced by the RB.
Nuclear Structure Committee (NSC)	1964	1966	Decided on proposals for nuclear structure research experiments and provided coordination for nuclear structure groups using the Synchro-Cyclotron (SC). Merged with the EmC to form the PH-III-COM.
Proton Synchrotron Committee (PSC)	1976	1978	Examined experimental proposals using the PS. Merged with the SCC to form the PSCC.
Proton Synchrotron and Synchro-Cyclotron Committee (PSCC)	1978	1990	Reviewed experimental proposals concerning the PS and SC. Split into the ISC, LEAR and SPSC when the SC shut down.
Synchro-Cyclotron Committee (SCC))	1976	1977	Renamed from the PH-III-COM. Evaluated experimental proposals for the SC. Merged with PSC to form the PSCC.
Super Proton Synchrotron Committee (SPSC) - 1st Period	1973	1990	Evaluated experimental proposals regarding use of the Super Proton Synchrotron. Transferred to the SPSLC.
Super Proton Synchrotron (SPS) and Low Energy Antiproton Ring (LEAR) Committee (SPSLC)	1990	1997	Examined experiment requests based on the availability of the accelerators and the physics interest of the proposals. Reverted to previous name (SPSC) when LEAR was decommissioned.
Track Chamber Committee (TPC)	1961	1976	Examined proposals for experiments concerning track chamber experiments. Commonly known as PH-II-COM. Merged with EEC to become the PSC.
