= Neutron Time Of Flight =

Facility at CERN with a neutron source

CERN Complex

Current particle and nuclear facilities
- LHC: Accelerates protons and heavy ions
- LEIR: Accelerates ions
- SPS: Accelerates protons and ions
- PSB: Accelerates protons
- PS: Accelerates protons or ions
- Linac 3: Injects heavy ions into LEIR
- Linac4: Accelerates ions
- AD: Decelerates antiprotons
- ELENA: Decelerates antiprotons
- ISOLDE: Produces radioactive ion beams
- MEDICIS: Produces isotopes for medical purposes

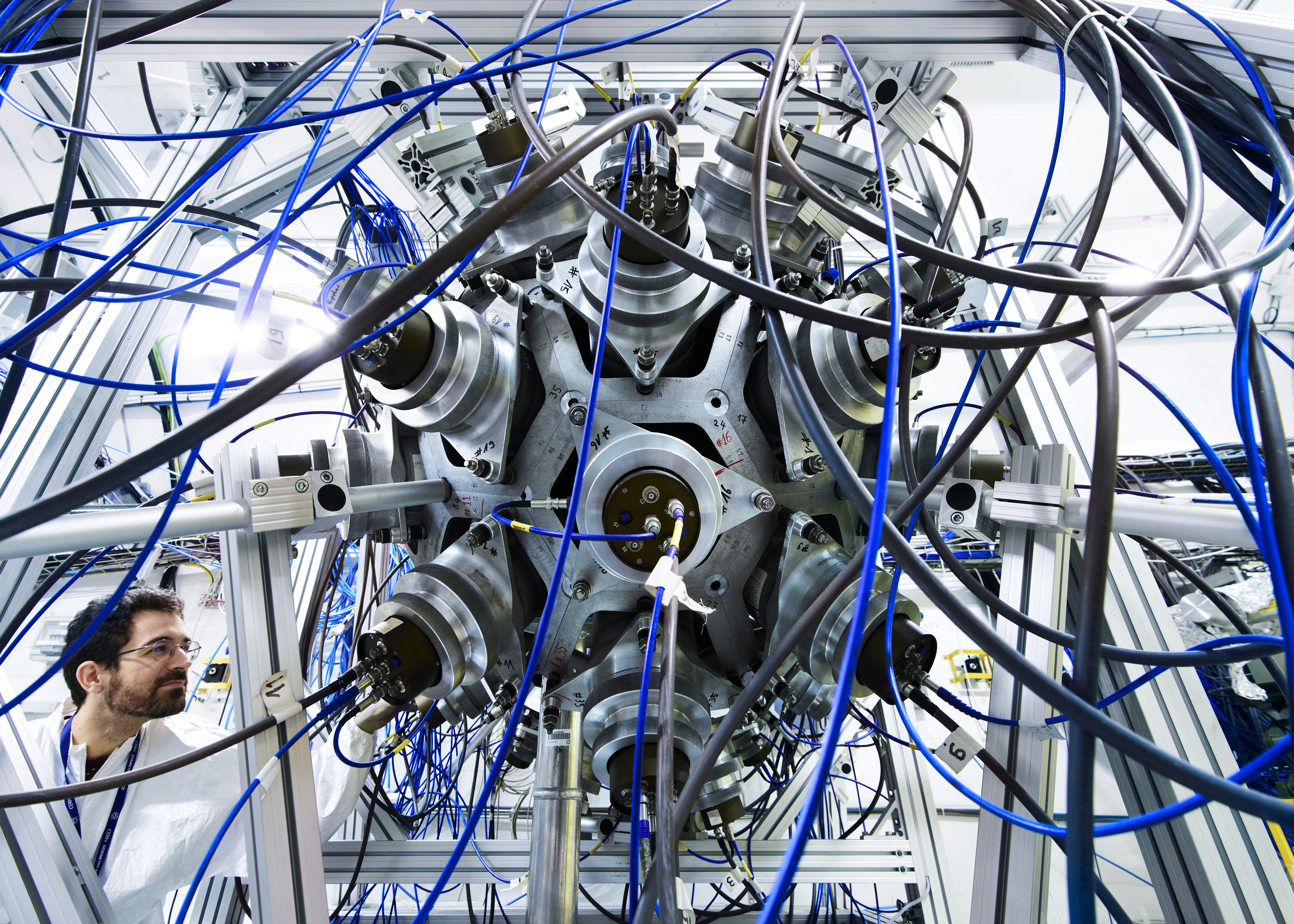
4π calorimeter inside the n_TOF experiment area 1 (EAR1)

The Neutron Time Of Flight (n_TOF) facility is a neutron spectrometer at CERN, with the aim of studying neutron-nucleus interactions over a range of kinetic energies, using the time of flight method. The research conducted at the facility has applications in nuclear technology and nuclear astrophysics. The facility has been in operation at CERN since 2001, following a proposal from the former Director General, Carlo Rubbia, for a high-intensity neutron source.

== Background ==
=== Time-of-flight ===
The time-of-flight technique is useful for studying nuclear structure at high energies. Neutron-induced reactions are measured by observing resonances in the yields of the reactions, specifically their cross-sections. Below the energy required to remove a neutron from the nucleus (neutron separation energy), transition probabilities can be deduced from measuring the gamma-ray spectra produced by the decaying nuclei. This information can be used to graph resonances which directly correspond to nuclear levels in the decaying nucleus. For increasing mass of the nuclei, the spacing between nuclear levels decreases, i.e. the level density increases. The level density is an important value for calculations involved in nuclear reaction rates, and have uses in astrophysical processes.

=== Nuclear astrophysics ===
Spectral analysis of light from stars is used to study stellar elemental composition, with most stars aligning along the main sequence of the Hertzsprung-Russell diagram. However, Red Giants have a large luminosity, and its spectra suggests heavy-element production takes place within the stars. Two major processes that take place in stars are rapid neutron capture (r-process) and slow neutron-capture process (s-process). The s-process contributes significantly to element abundances in Red Giant, from iron to lead-bismuth. Neutron capture and beta decay occur during the s-process and leads to nucleosynthesis (creation of new atomic nuclei) along the neutron-rich side of the nuclear valley of stability. Neutron capture measurements are used to determine branching ratios of the s-process, which provide understanding of stellar evolution and the elemental history of stars.

=== Nuclear technology ===
Current nuclear fission technology has several limitations, including low uranium efficiency and a high-level of nuclear waste production. Subcritical Accelerator Driven Systems (ADS) and Generation IV fast nuclear reactors are two solutions that may decrease these limitations. Obtaining accurate neutron data, particularly high-resolution and high-accuracy cross-section data, is essential for nuclear system design.

== Experimental setup ==
Cooling station of the third generation n_TOF spallation target

The n_TOF facility consists of a pulsed source, specifically a beam of 20 GeV/c protons from the Proton Synchrotron (PS) impinging on a lead target. The lead target used is cooled using liquid nitrogen, previously water-cooled (before Long Shutdown 2), and is made of several slabs. The facility also has a 185 m horizontal flight path, along with a 20 m vertical flight path added later in its operation. The flight path allows for a high energy resolution, optimised for measurements of samples with low mass and low cross-section by the vertical flight path.

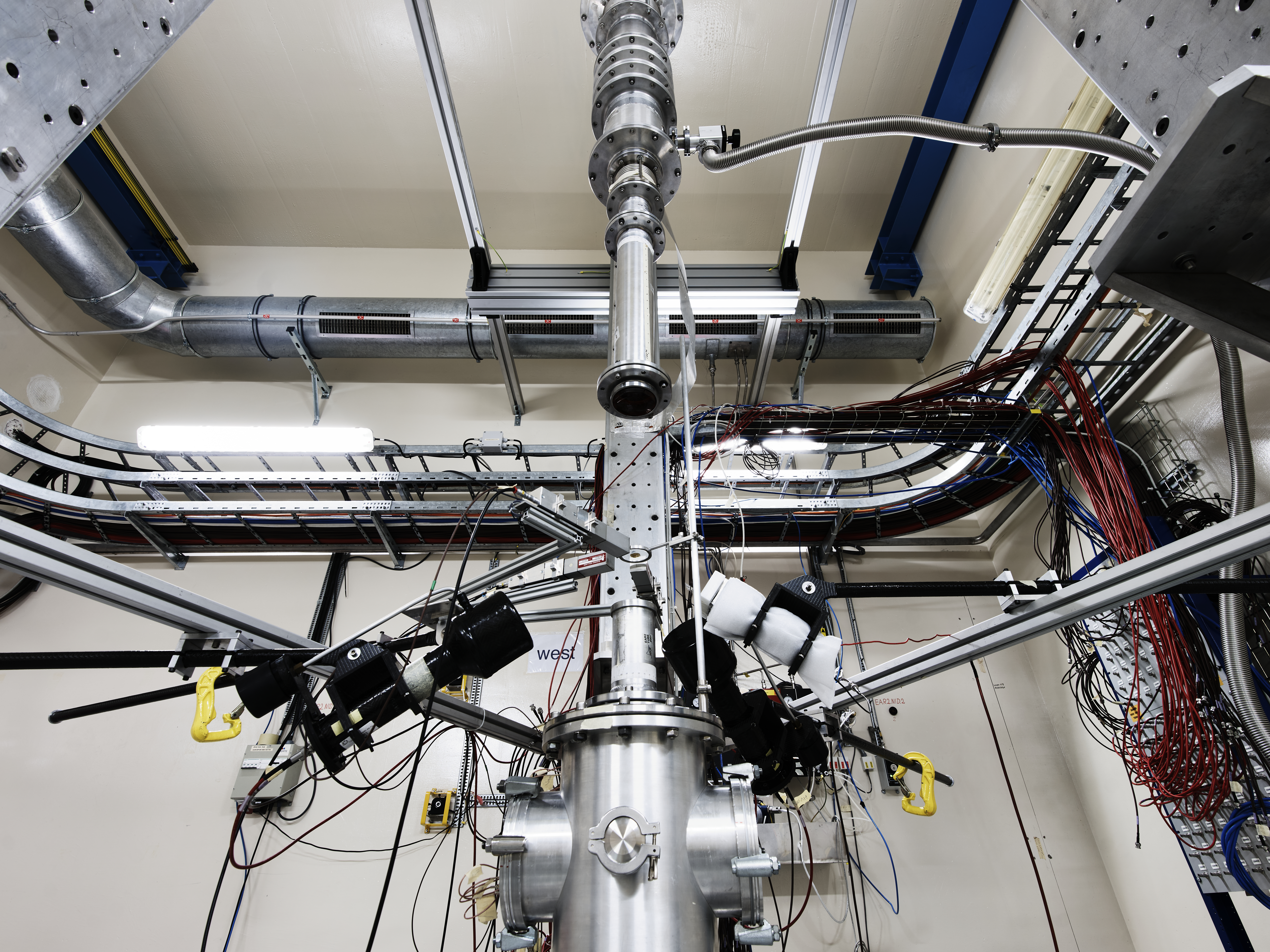
n_TOF experimental area 2 (EAR2)

Neutrons are produced when the pulsed beam of protons is directed at the lead target, via neutron spallation reactions. For each proton, about 300 neutrons are expelled. The neutrons are slowed after being emitted, first by the lead target and afterwards by the slab containing water. From this, there is a wide range of neutron energies as neutrons will slow down by varying amounts, forming a spectrum of kinetic energies from meV to GeV. Finally, the neutrons are collimated and ejected through the flight path before they arrive at an experimental area.

n_TOF uses a total absorption calorimeter (TAC), made of 42 pentagonal and hexagonal BaF_{2} crystals, providing full solid angle coverage. The detector is used to measure the gamma ray cascades that are produced from neutron capture reactions, and has a near 100% efficiency for detecting these reactions.
