= High Luminosity Large Hadron Collider =

Upgrade to the Large Hadron Collider at CERN

The High Luminosity Large Hadron Collider (HL-LHC; formerly referred to as HiLumi LHC, Super LHC, and SLHC) is an upgrade to the Large Hadron Collider, operated by the European Organization for Nuclear Research (CERN), located at the French-Swiss border near Geneva. From 2011 to 2020, the project was led by Lucio Rossi. In 2020, the lead role was taken up by Oliver Brüning.

The upgrade started as a design study in 2010, for which a European Framework Program 7 grant was allocated in 2011, with goal of boosting the accelerator's potential for new discoveries in physics. The design study was approved by the CERN Council in 2016 through which HL-LHC became a full-fledged CERN project. The upgrade work is currently in progress and physics experiments are expected to start taking data at the earliest in 2030.

The HL-LHC project will deliver proton–proton collisions at 14 TeV with an integrated luminosity of 3 ab^{−1} for both ATLAS and CMS experiments, 50 fb^{−1} for LHCb, and 5 fb^{−1} for ALICE. In the heavy-ion sector, the integrated luminosities of 13 nb^{−1} and 50 nb^{−1} will be delivered for lead–lead and proton–lead collisions, respectively. The unit inverse femtobarn (fb^{−1}) measures the time-integrated luminosity in terms of the number of collisions per femtobarn of the target's cross-section. The increase in the integrated luminosity for the aforementioned major LHC experiments will provide a better chance to see rare processes and improving statistically marginal measurements.

== Introduction ==
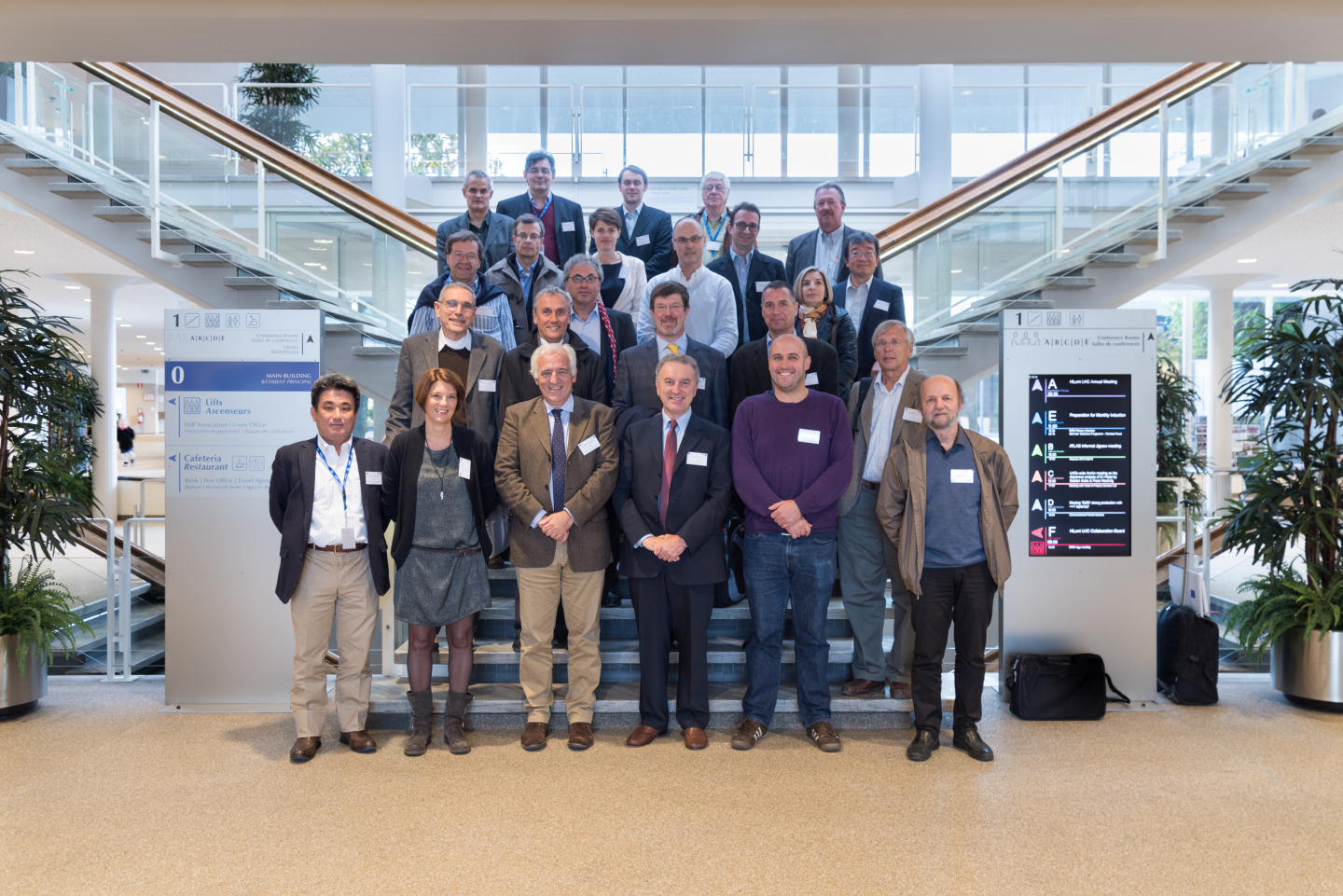
Members of the 5th High Luminosity LHC Collaboration Board and Participants of the 5th Joint HiLumi LHC-LARP Annual Meeting gathered at CERN in October 2015.

Many different paths exist for upgrading colliders. A collection of different designs of the high luminosity interaction regions is being maintained by the European Organization for Nuclear Research (CERN). A workshop was held in 2006 to establish the most promising options.

Increasing LHC luminosity involves reduction of the beam size at the collision point, and either the reduction of bunch length and spacing, or significant increase in bunch length and population. The maximum instantaneous luminosity increase of the existing nominal LHC luminosity (1×10^{34} cm^{−2}⋅s^{−1}) is about a factor of 4 higher than the LHC's performance at its peak luminosity of 2×10^{34} cm^{−2}⋅s^{−1}, unfortunately well below the LHC upgrade project's initial ambition of a factor of 10. However, at the LUMI'06 workshop, several suggestions were proposed that would boost the LHC peak luminosity by a factor of 10 beyond nominal towards 1×10^{35} cm^{−2}⋅s^{−1}.

The peak luminosity at LHC was limited due to the cooling capacity of its triplet magnets and secondly due to the detector limits. The resultant higher event rate posed challenges for the particle detectors located in the collision areas. Through the ongoing upgrades, HL-LHC's peak luminosity is expected to be 5×10^{34} cm^{−2}⋅s^{−1} and would most likely be pushed to 7.5×10^{34} cm^{−2}⋅s^{−1}.

== Physics goals ==
The HL-LHC upgrade being applicable to almost all major LHC experiments has a wide range of physics goals. Increasing the number of collisions per bunch crossing to 140, each time a proton bunch meets at the center of the detectors, from the current number of 60, will open a number of new avenues for observing rare processes and particles. The boost in the integrated luminosity, or evidently the larger collision event datasets that would be accumulated through HL-LHC in case of all the LHC experiments, is the most significant aspect towards achieving the goals described below. The motivation for the construction of large underground infrastructure at HL-LHC therefore, is to have a high efficiency and highly reliable machine that can deliver the required integrated luminosity.

Major goals of HL-LHC thus belong to the following five categories; improved Standard Model measurements, searches for beyond the Standard Model (BSM) physics, flavor physics of heavy quarks and leptons, studies of the properties of the Higgs boson, and the studies of QCD matter at high density and temperature.

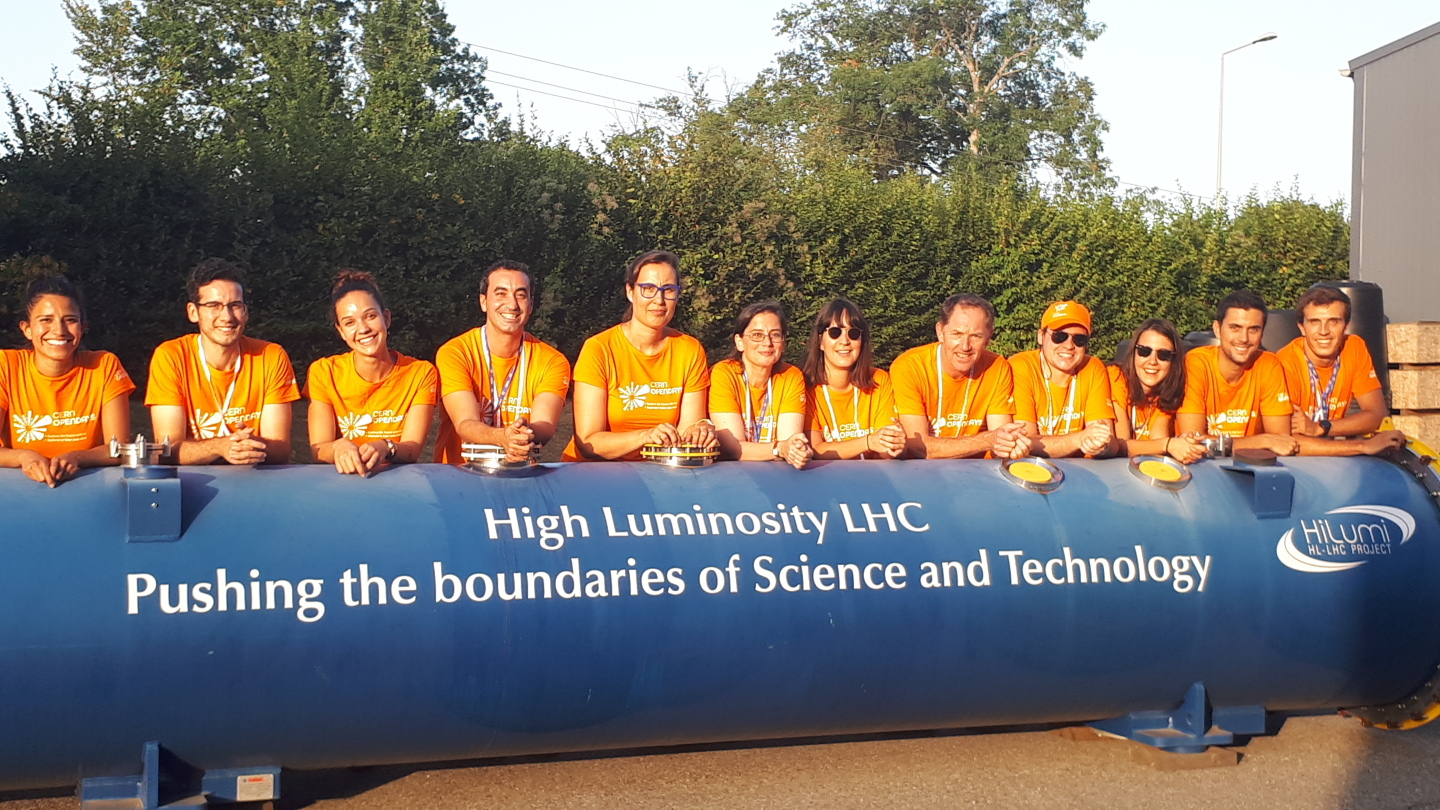
In September 2019, CERN opened its doors to the public for two special days at the heart of one of the world's largest particle-physics laboratories. At this occasion CERN specialists presented the High Luminosity LHC project to members of the general public.

Measurements of the Higgs boson and understanding its connection to the electroweak symmetry breaking remains the primary goal. In the domain of flavour physics; LHCb, ATLAS and CMS together will test the unitarity of the Cabibbo–Kobayashi–Maskawa matrix, while ATLAS and CMS will measure the properties of the top quark, the fermion with the largest known mass and largest Yukawa coupling. HL-LHC will also add to the knowledge of parton distribution functions (PDFs) by measuring several Standard Model processes with the jets, top quarks, photons and electroweak gauge bosons in their final state. The jet and photon production in the heavy ion collisions forms the basis of QCD perturbation theory probes, and HL-LHC will measure this at very high energy scales. Owing to these high energy collisions, there is also a possibility for HL-LHC to detect BSM phenomena such as baryogenesis, dark matter, answers to the flavour problem, neutrino masses and insights into the strong CP problem.

Work is ongoing on the upgrade of the heavy-ion injectors. Upon its completion, enhanced capabilities will become available for the detection of rare processes and for BSM physics searches.

== Project timeline ==
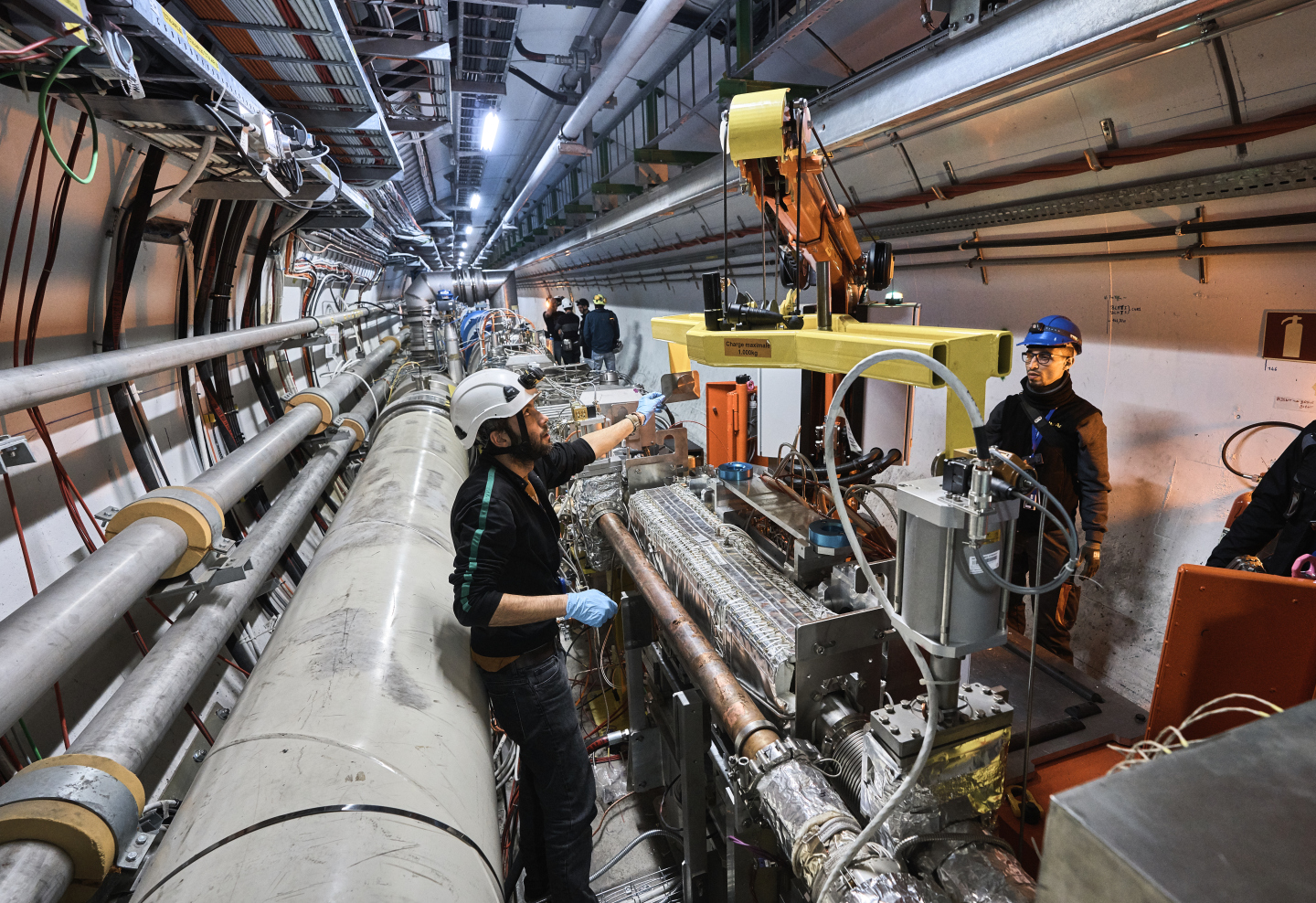
Collimator installation in the LHC ring at Point 1, 2018

The HL-LHC project was initiated in 2010, and the following has been the timeline till 2020, followed by the tentative future stages.

- 2010: HL-LHC was established at CERN as a design study.
- 2011: The FP7 HL-LHC design study was approved and started.
- 2014: The first preliminary report on the design study was published.
- 2015: Budget and schedule along with technical design report was made available.
- 2016: CERN Council approved the HL-LHC project with its initial budget and schedule. Followed by which the hardware parts consisting of components and models were validated.
- 2018–2020: The prototypes were tested and final Technical Design report was published. The underground excavation work was also carried out. Although the civil engineering work and prototyping process would continue till the end of 2022.

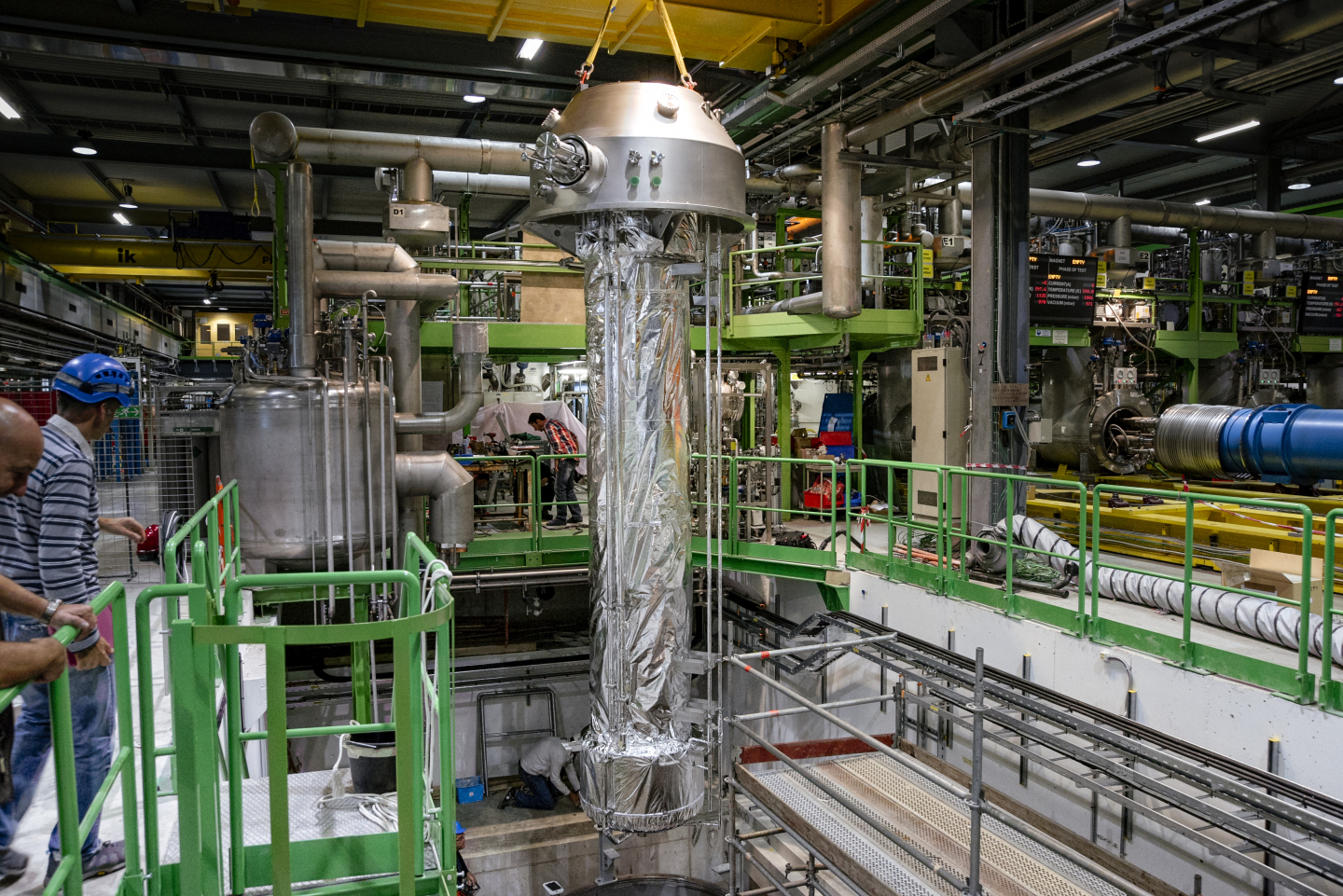
High Luminosity LHC – clusterD test station vertical cryostat installation seen in CERN's magnet test facility (SM18).

- 2019–2024: The construction and testing of hardware parts took place.
- 2022: All underground civil engineering work was successfully terminated.
- 2023: All new surface buildings were handed over to CERN.
- 2025: Production of the new inner triplet quadrupole magnets.
- 2026: Replacement of the existing quadrupole magnets at the end of the nominal LHC running period.
- 2026–2030: New magnets, crab-cavities, cryo lines, absorbers, collimators, superconducting links, and ancillary equipment are planned to be installed.

If all above planned activities are completed according to the timeline, HL-LHC will be able to start taking physics data with Run 4 in mid 2030. Run 4 will continue until the end of 2033, where Long Shutdown 4 will cease all operations until Run 5 is scheduled to begin in mid 2036. Current HL-LHC operation planning has approved Run 5 data taking until the end of 2041.

== Accelerator upgrades ==
The following upgrades to machine systems forms the core of the new HL-LHC.

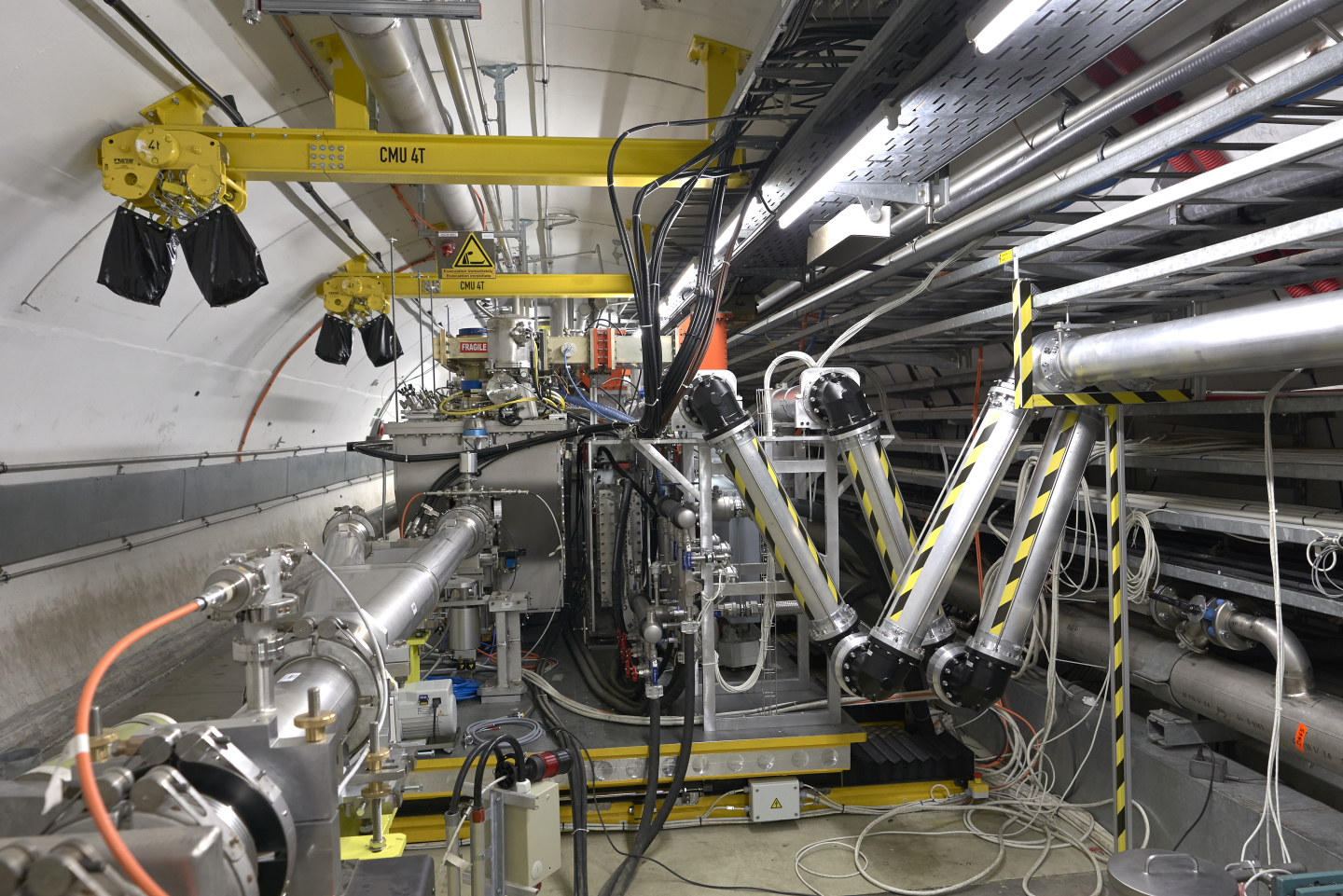
Installation of the crab cavity test facility for High Luminosity LHC in the Super Proton Synchrotron tunnel

Quadrupole magnets: The strong magnets along with the huge rings are a necessary aspect of LHC's functionality. HL-LHC will have quadrupole magnets with the strength of 11.3 tesla as opposed to 8.6 tesla in LHC. Such superconducting magnets made up of inter-metallic niobium–tin (Nb_{3}Sn), compound would be installed around the CMS and ATLAS detector. A ten-year-long joint project between CERN, Brookhaven National Laboratory, Fermilab, and Lawrence Berkeley National Laboratory known as United States Department of Energy LHC Accelerator Research Program (US–LARP) successfully built and tested such quadrupole magnets. MQXFB, the quadrupoles for the HL-LHC, are, as of 2025, in the series production phase, with around 2/3 of the coils completed and half of the magnets assembled.

Dipole magnets: For inserting the new collimators, two of the LHC's dipole magnets will have to be replaced with smaller ones. They would be stronger (11 tesla) than LHC's dipole magnets (8.3 tesla) and be more powerful in bending the beam trajectories. As of now they are in the prototype phase at CERN and halfway through the production phase in the USA. These magnets would probably be installed only after HL-LHC is fully implemented, although the final decision is yet to come.

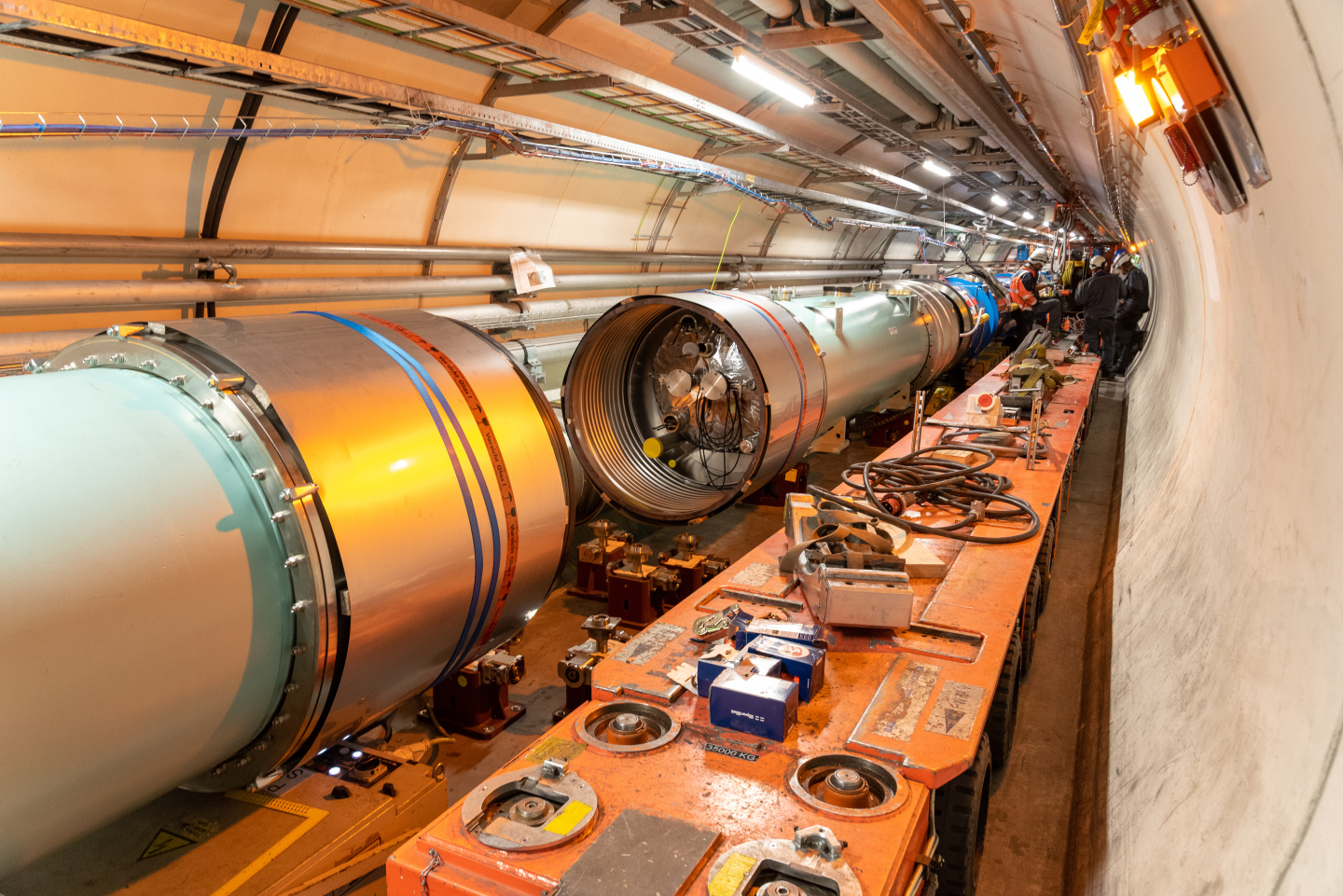
Installation of two High Luminosity LHC connection cryostats, November 2019.

Crab cavities: The function of the crab cavities is to tilt and project the beams in the required direction. This tilting maximizes the overlap between the colliding bunches, leading to an increase in the achievable instantaneous luminosity. ATLAS and CMS together will have 16 crab cavities, which will give transverse momentum to the beams to increase the collision probability. Currently a prototype demonstration of crabbing of a hadron beam has been realised, and several key beam experiments have been conducted in CERNs Super Proton Synchrotron in the presence of crab cavities.

Beam optics: As per the current HL-LHC design the beam intensity will decrease due to the burn-off of the circulating proton beams inside the collider. Maintaining the intensity at a constant level throughout the lifespan of beam is thus a major challenge. Nevertheless, plan is to at least have a system that would allow beam focusing or the concentration of the beams before the collision to remain constant.

Cryogenics: Implementation of HL-LHC would require larger cryogenic plants, plus larger 1.8 kelvin refrigerators, along with sub-cooling heat exchangers. New cooling circuits are also to be developed. The majority of these upgrades are for interaction points, P1, P4, P5, and P7. While P1, P4, and P5 will receive new cryogenic plants, P7 will have new cryogenic circuits.

Machine protection and collimators: The collimators are responsible for absorbing any extra particles that deviate from the original beam trajectory and can potentially damage the machines. The higher luminosities are bound to generate such highly energetic particles. HL-LHC design thus contains ways to prevent damages by replacing 60 out of 118 collimators and adding about 20 new ones. The upgraded collimators will also have lower electromagnetic interference with beams.

Superconducting power lines: To meet the HL-LHC accelerator requirements, superconducting power transmission lines made of magnesium diboride (MgB_{2}) will be used to transmit the current of about 100000 amperes.

== Injector upgrades ==
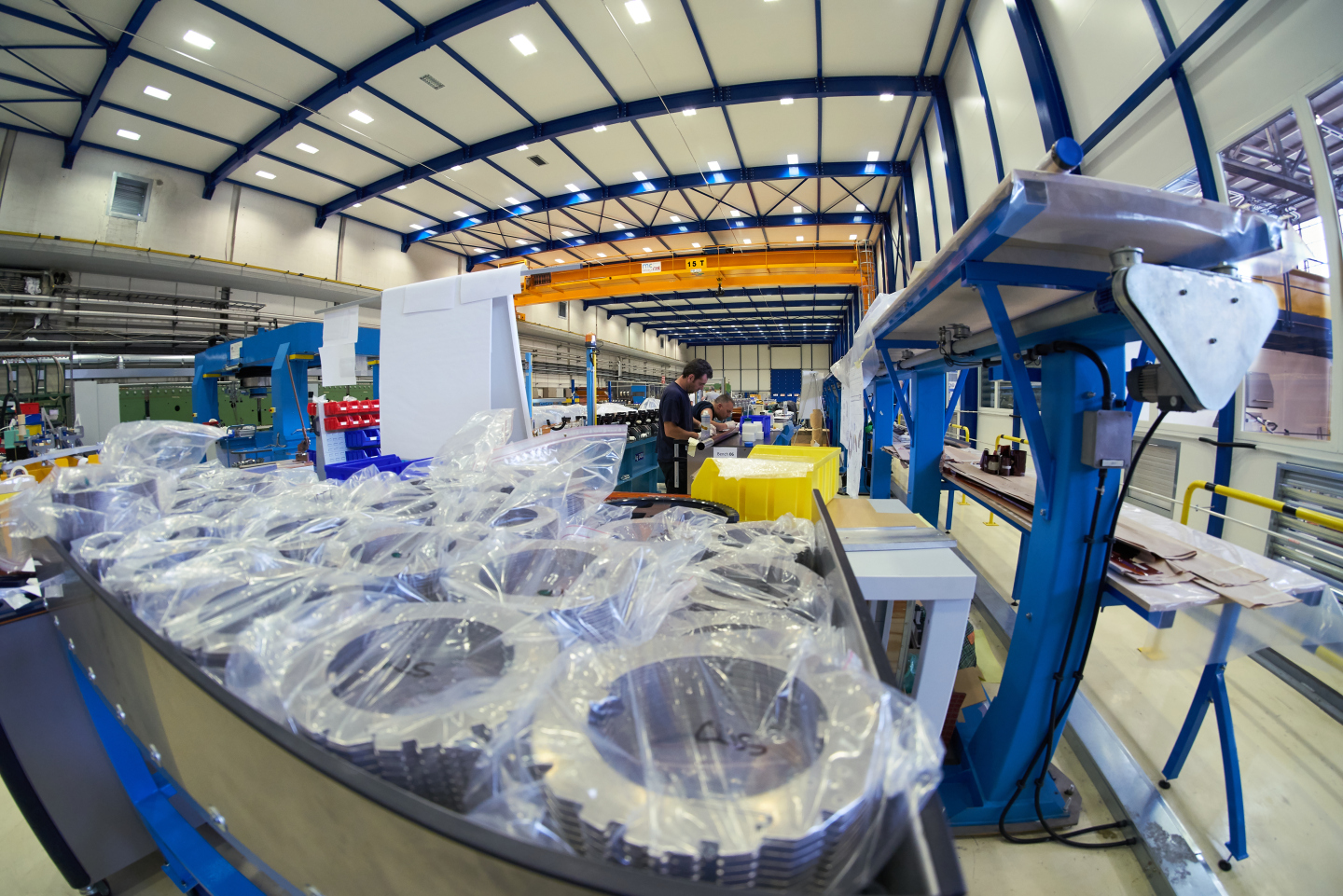
New long-coils for the Nb_{3}Sn quadrupole magnets for High Luminosity LHC, June 2017

As part of the HL-LHC, significant changes will be made to the proton injector. The beams that come to LHC are pre-accelerated by following 4 accelerators.

1. Linear Accelerator (Linac4)
2. Proton Synchrotron Booster (PSB)
3. Proton Synchrotron (PS)
4. Super Proton Synchrotron (SPS)

All four of these accelerators, together known as the Injectors will be upgraded through the LHC Injector Upgrade (LIU) project during the Long Shutdown 2 (LS2). The LIU is responsible for delivering beams of very high brightness to HL-LHC. The proton injectors will be upgraded to produce proton beams with double the original luminosity and 2.4 times the brightness.

The replacement of Linear Accelerator 2 (Linac2 – which delivered the proton beams) with Linear Accelerator 4 (Linac4) was achieved in 2020. The Linac4 is a 160 MeV linear accelerator and delivers H^{−} beams with twice the beam brightness compared to its older counterparts. LIU also upgraded the cesiated radiofrequency-plasma H^{−} ion source that feeds Linac4. The challenge here was to have a high current, low emittance source beam.

Heavy-ion injector upgrades through the upgrades to the Low Energy Ion Ring (LEIR) and Linac3 are also being designed. The source extraction system of Linac3 was re-designed, and by the end of LS2 it successfully increased the extracted source beam intensity by 20%.

== Upgrade program of the experiments ==
To handle the increased luminosity, number of simultaneous particle interactions, massive amount of data, and radiation of the HL-LHC environment, the detectors will be upgraded.

ALICE: The upgrade will increase the lifetime of the Tile Calorimeter (TileCal), which is a hadronic calorimeter sensitive to charged particles, by 20 years. The beam pipe at ALICE will also be replaced by one with a smaller diameter. The tracking system and the time projection chambers will be upgraded along with a new faster interaction trigger detector.

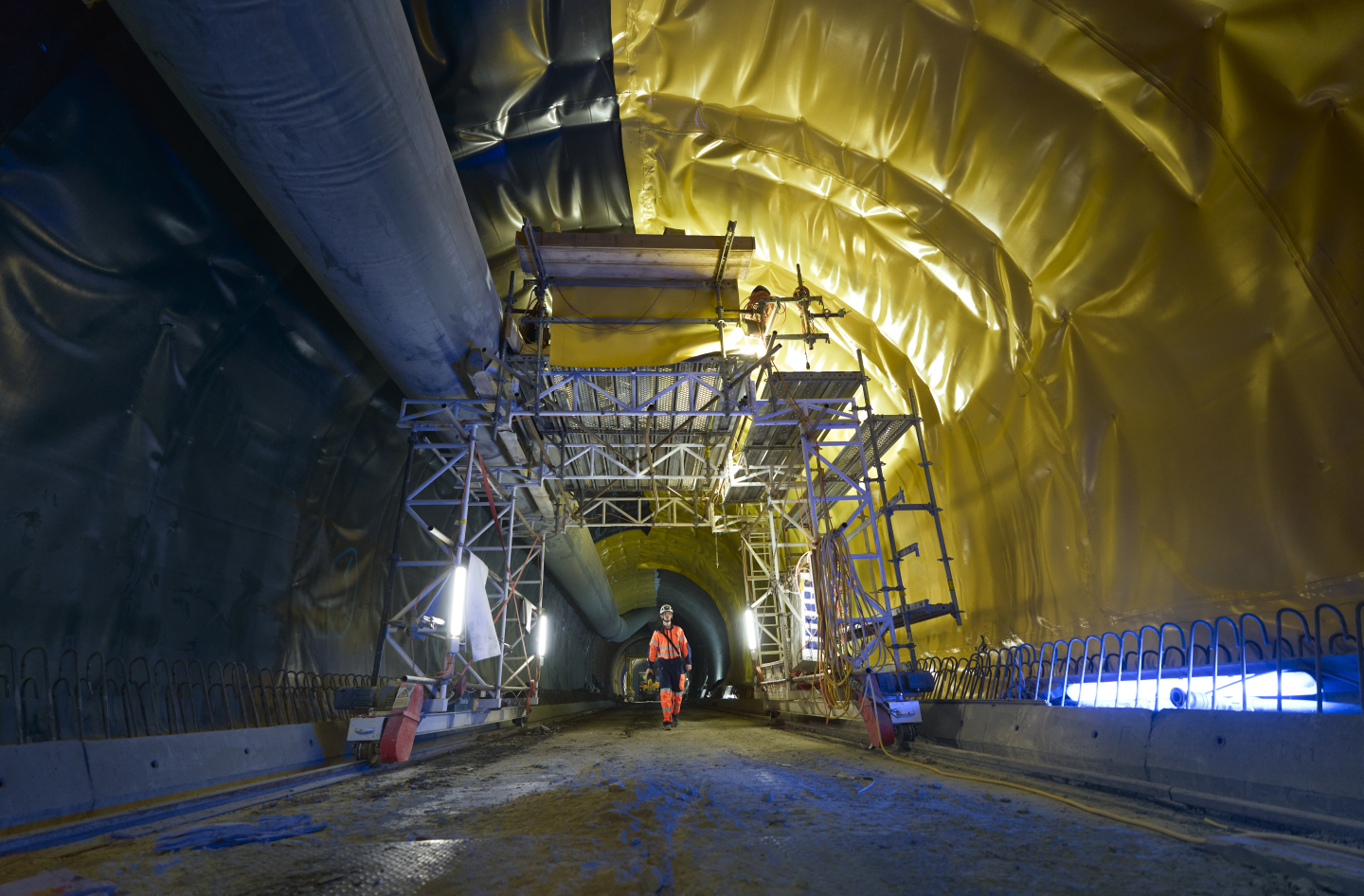
Concrete coating of underground area close to LHC Point 1 (P1 – ATLAS) to prepare for High Luminosity LHC, November 2019

ATLAS: The liquid argon calorimeter at ATLAS will be upgraded to identify the electrons and photons more effectively. The main readout electronics of the calorimeter will be completely replaced to let the detector identify rare particle interactions. These changes are planned for Long Shutdown 3 (LS3) of LHC.

CMS: CMS will carry out numerous upgrades to its inner tracking system, the trigger system, the calorimeter, and the muon detection systems during Long Shutdown 2 (LS2) and LS3. These changes are based on the expected pile-up densities and increase in radiation due to the higher luminosity. Highlights include a much higher resolution and more radiation hard inner tracker, and the highest energy, position, and timing resolution silicon and scintillator based calorimeter ever produced, with some 6 million silicon channels and 240,000 scintillator channels. At over 600 m^{2} of silicon, this will be the largest silicon detector by area.

FASER-2: LHC's FASER experiment will undergo several upgrades and be turned into FASER-2 to fully utilize HL-LHC's capabilities. It will have a decay volume of 10 m^{3}, which is 3 orders of magnitude higher than FASER and will increase the sensitivity range by 4 orders of magnitude. It will probe into the regime of dark photons, dark Higgs bosons, heavy neutral leptons, and weak gauge boson coupling. It will also have the subdetector FASERnu for neutrino and antineutrino observations.

LHCb: LHCb will receive reduced aperture central vacuum chambers during LS2. The Vertex Locator (VELO) detector, which measures the primary and displaced vertices of short-lived particles, will be enhanced to meet the increased radiation and particle interaction rates.

MoEDAL: For LHCs Run-3 MoEDAL will implement a new sub-detector called MoEDAL's Apparatus for the detection of Penetrating Particles (MAPP). For HL-LHC MAPP-1 would be upgraded to MAPP-2.

Scattering and Neutrino Detector (SND): SND and will begin its first operation only in 2022, during the LHC Run-3. The upgrade plan for SND at HL-LHC is to continue developing the detector with the aim of improving the statistics of collision events, and expand its pseudorapidity range for studies of heavy-quark production and neutrino interactions.

TOTEM: The TOTEM-CMS collaboration, which has been operating the Proton Precision Spectrometer (PPS) since 2016, will measure the central-exclusive production events at the HL-LHC with an upgraded version of the near-beam PPS.
