= Larp (disambiguation) =

LARP, or live-action role-playing, is a form of role-playing game in which participants physically act out their characters' actions.

Larp or LARP may also refer to:

- Larping (slang), a term for someone being fake or performative, similar to calling them a "poser"
- Larp (dish), the national dish of Laos
- Laser-activated remote phosphor
- LHC Accelerator Research Program
- Jubensha, a script-based role-playing game developed in China

== See also ==
- Murder mystery game, a genre of party games centred on solving a fictional murder
- False flag, a covert operation designed to deceive
