= Super Proton Synchrotron =

Particle accelerator at CERN, Switzerland

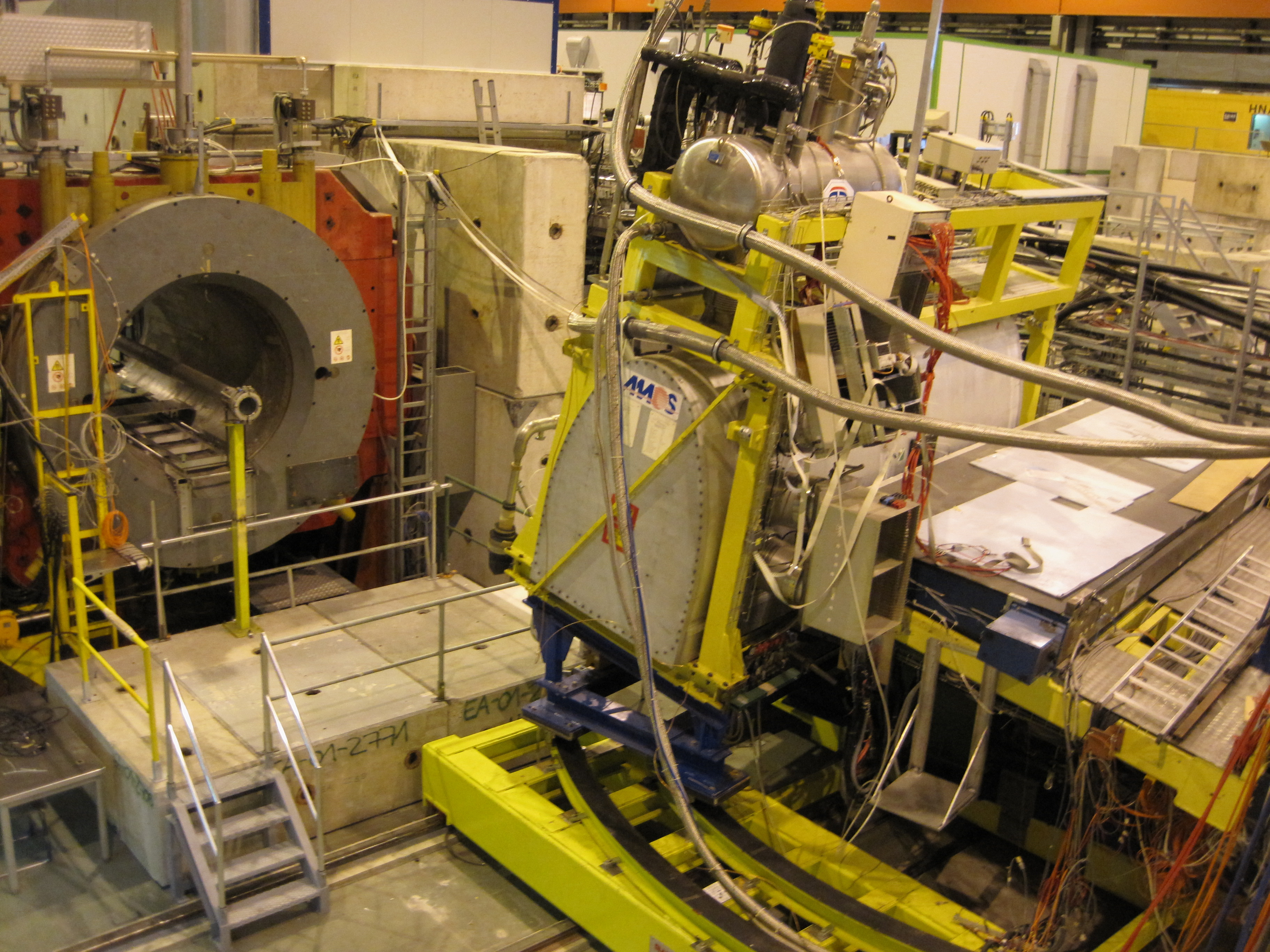
- Test beamline delivered from the SPS. In photo 20 GeV positrons are used to calibrate the Alpha Magnetic Spectrometer.

General properties
- Accelerator type: Synchrotron
- Beam type: protons, heavy ions
- Target type: Injector for LHC, fixed target

Beam properties
- Maximum energy: 450 GeV

Physical properties
- Circumference: 6.9 kilometres (4.3 mi)
- Coordinates: 46°14′06″N 6°02′33″E
- Institution: CERN
- Dates of operation: 1976–present
- Preceded by: Spp̅S

CERN Complex

Current particle and nuclear facilities
- LHC: Accelerates protons and heavy ions
- LEIR: Accelerates ions
- SPS: Accelerates protons and ions
- PSB: Accelerates protons
- PS: Accelerates protons or ions
- Linac 3: Injects heavy ions into LEIR
- Linac4: Accelerates ions
- AD: Decelerates antiprotons
- ELENA: Decelerates antiprotons
- ISOLDE: Produces radioactive ion beams
- MEDICIS: Produces isotopes for medical purposes

The Super Proton Synchrotron (SPS) is a particle accelerator of the synchrotron type at CERN. It is housed in a circular tunnel, 6.9 km (4 1/3 miles) in circumference, straddling the border of France and Switzerland near Geneva, Switzerland.

== History ==
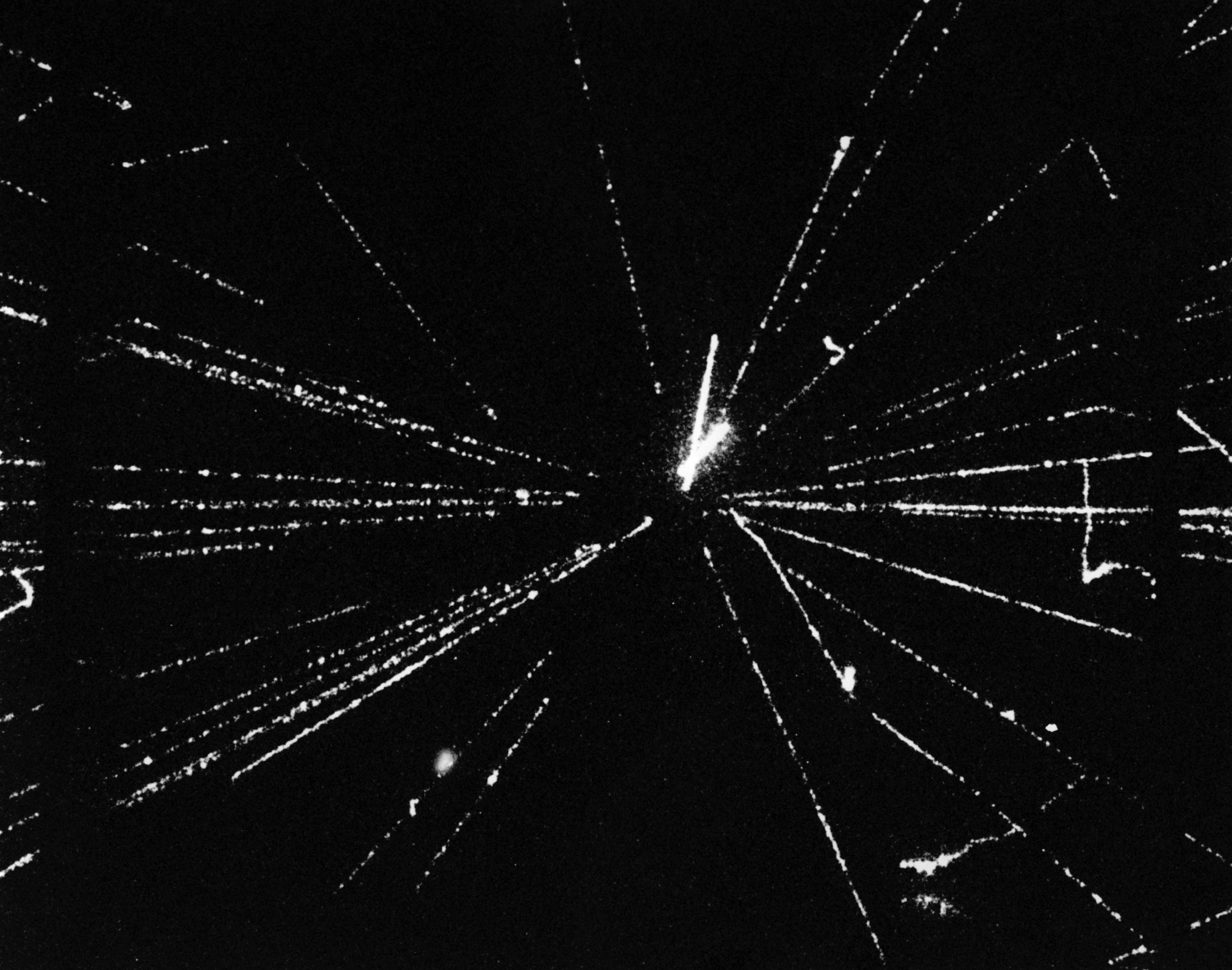
A proton–antiproton collision from the UA5 experiment at the SPS in 1982

The SPS was designed by a team led by John Adams, director-general of what was then known as Laboratory II. Originally specified as a 300 GeV accelerator, the SPS was actually built to be capable of 400 GeV, an operating energy it achieved on the official commissioning date of 17 June 1976. However, by that time, this energy had been exceeded by Fermilab, which reached an energy of 500 GeV on 14 May of that year.

The SPS has been used to accelerate protons and antiprotons, electrons and positrons (for use as the injector for the Large Electron–Positron Collider (LEP)), and heavy ions.

From 1981 to 1991, the SPS operated as a hadron (more precisely, proton–antiproton) collider (as such it was called Spp̅S), when its beams provided the data for the UA1 and UA2 experiments, which resulted in the discovery of the W and Z bosons. These discoveries and a new technique for cooling particles led to a Nobel Prize for Carlo Rubbia and Simon van der Meer in 1984.

From 2006 to 2012, the SPS was used by the CNGS experiment to produce a neutrino beam to be detected at the Gran Sasso laboratory in Italy, 730 km (450 miles) from CERN.

== Later operations ==
The SPS is used as the final injector for high-intensity proton beams for the Large Hadron Collider (LHC), which began preliminary operation on 10 September 2008, for which it accelerates protons from 26 to 450 GeV. The LHC itself then accelerates them to several teraelectronvolts (TeV).

Operation as an injector allows continuation of the ongoing fixed-target research program, where the SPS provides 400 GeV proton beams for a number of active fixed-target experiments, including COMPASS, NA61/SHINE and NA62.

The SPS has served, and continues to be used as a test bench for new concepts in accelerator physics. In 1999 it served as an observatory for the electron cloud phenomenon. In 2002 and 2004, SPS produced gold nuclei from lead targets. In 2003, SPS was the first machine where the Hamiltonian resonance driving terms were directly measured. And in 2004, experiments to cancel the detrimental effects of beam encounters (like those in the LHC) were carried out.

The SPS RF cavities operate at a center frequency of 200.2 MHz.

== Major discoveries ==
Major scientific discoveries made by experiments that operated at the SPS include the following.

- 1983: The discovery of W and Z bosons in the UA1 and UA2 experiments. The 1984 Nobel Prize in physics was awarded to Carlo Rubbia and Simon van der Meer for the developments that led to this discovery.
- 1999: The discovery of direct CP violation by the NA48 experiment.

== Upgrade for high luminosity LHC ==
The Large Hadron Collider will require an upgrade to considerably increase its luminosity during the 2020s. This would require upgrades to the entire linac/pre-injector/injector chain, including the SPS.

As part of this, the SPS will need to be able to handle a much higher intensity beam. One improvement considered in the past was increasing the extraction energy to 1 TeV. However, the extraction energy will be kept at 450 GeV while other systems are upgraded. The acceleration system will be modified to handle the higher voltages needed to accelerate a higher intensity beam. The beam dumping system will also be upgraded so it can accept a higher intensity beam without sustaining significant damage.
