= CERN Hadron Linacs =

Group of particle accelerators

CERN Complex

Current particle and nuclear facilities
- LHC: Accelerates protons and heavy ions
- LEIR: Accelerates ions
- SPS: Accelerates protons and ions
- PSB: Accelerates protons
- PS: Accelerates protons or ions
- Linac 3: Injects heavy ions into LEIR
- Linac4: Accelerates ions
- AD: Decelerates antiprotons
- ELENA: Decelerates antiprotons
- ISOLDE: Produces radioactive ion beams
- MEDICIS: Produces isotopes for medical purposes

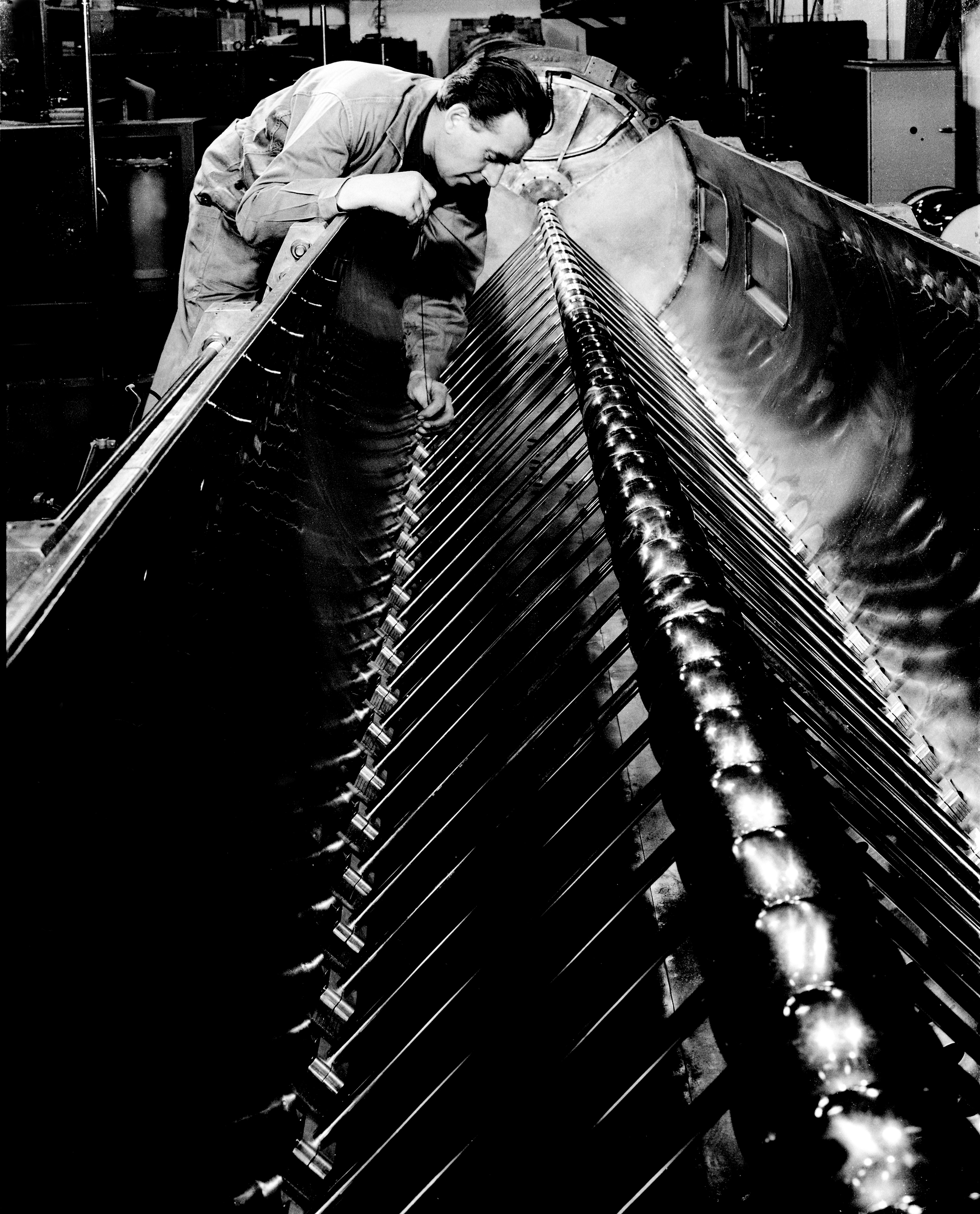
Internal view of the first CERN Linac

The CERN Hadron Linacs are linear accelerators that accelerate beams of hadrons from a standstill to be used by the larger circular accelerators at the facility.

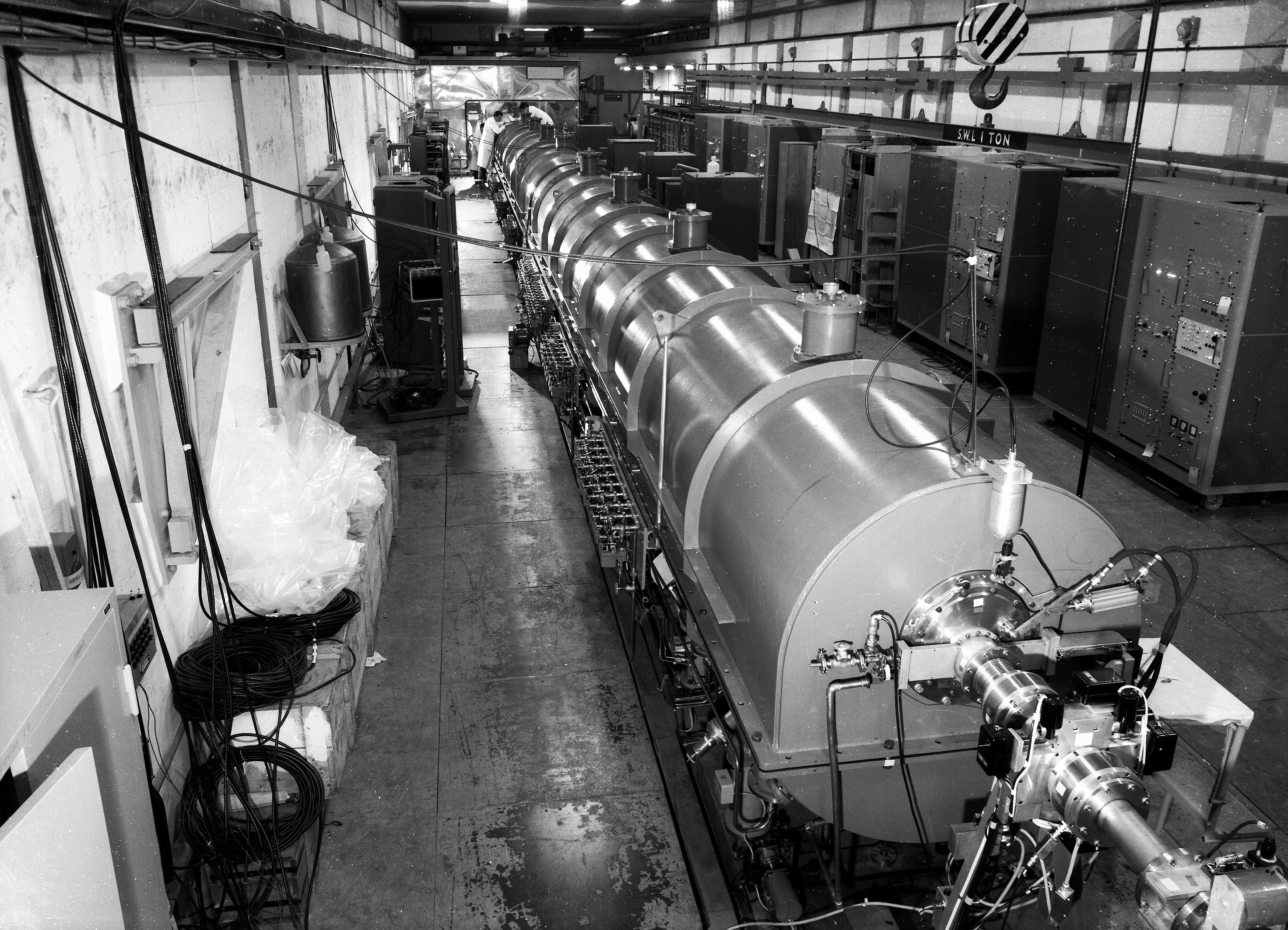
The first CERN Linac, operating from 1958 until 1992

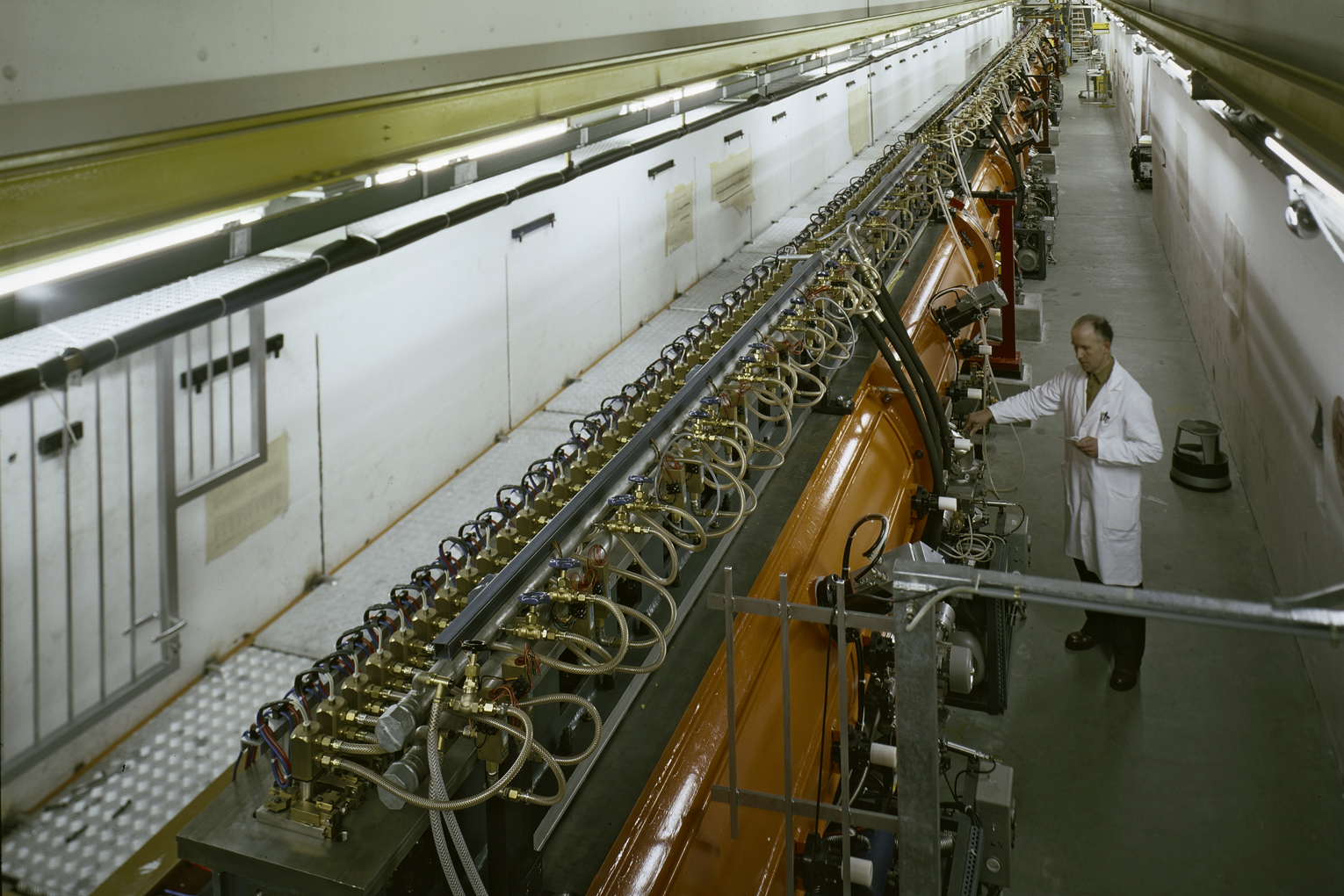
Linac 2, operating from 1978 to 2018, was used to accelerate protons

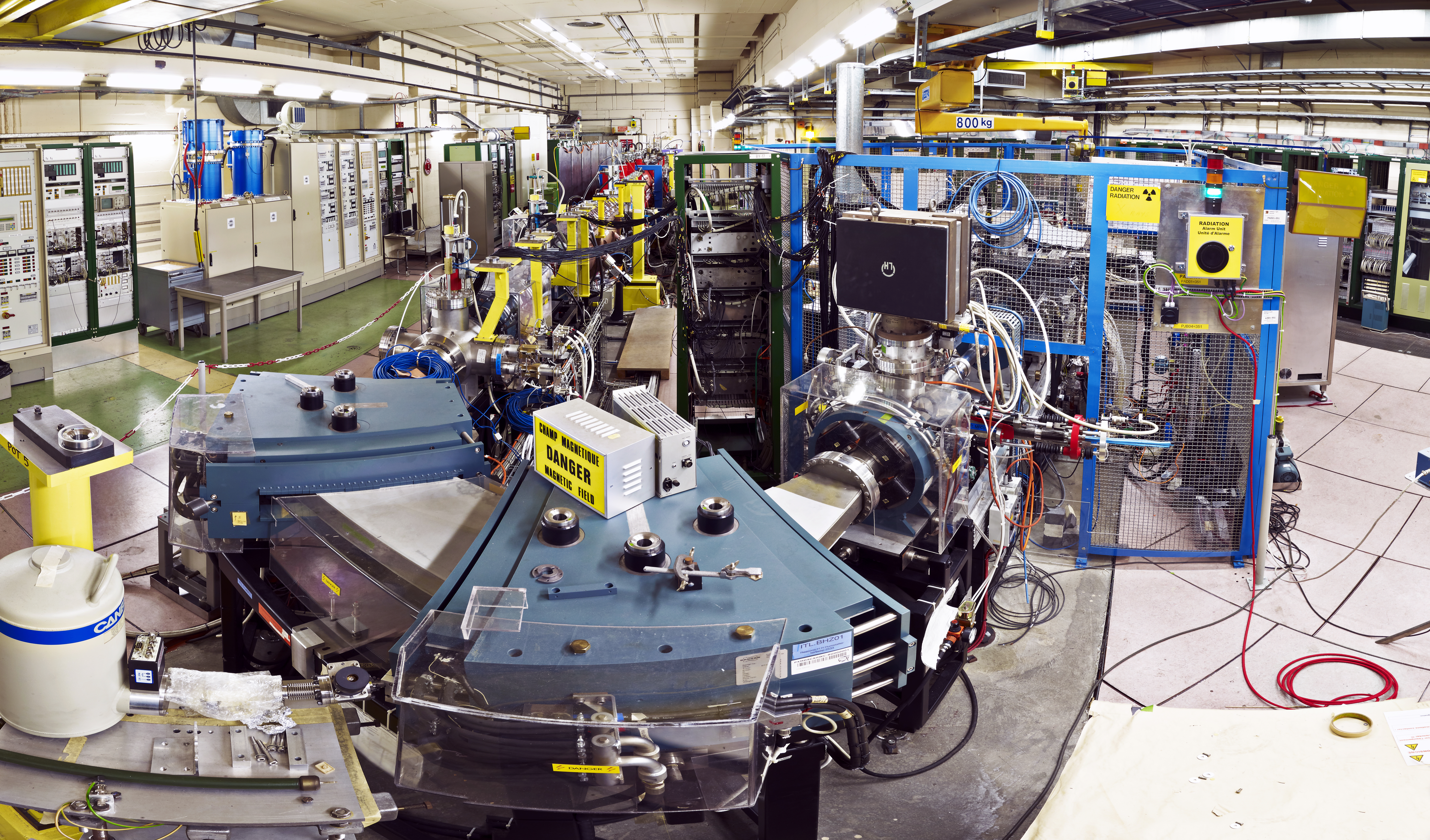
Linac 3, currently (as of 2020) used to accelerate ions

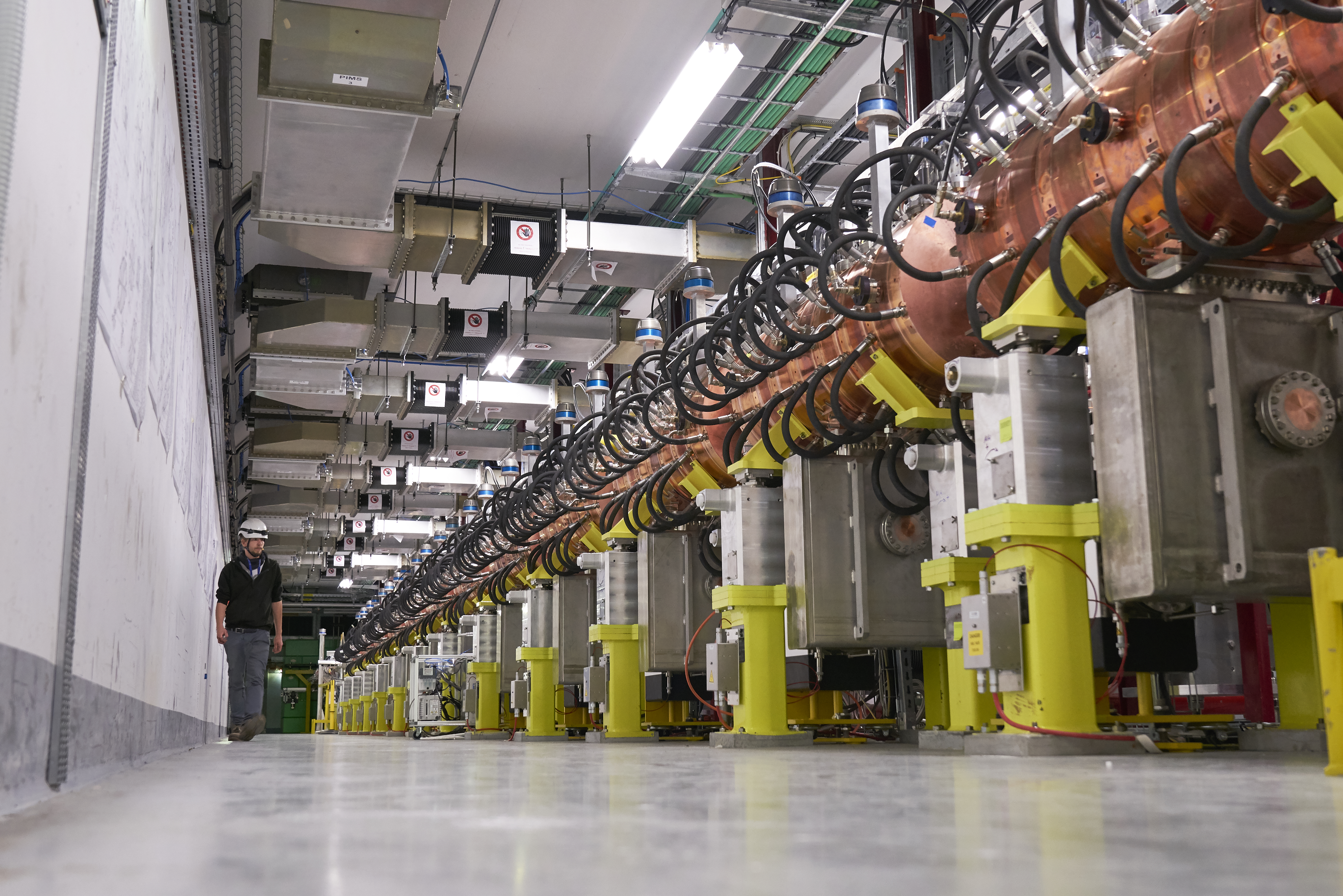
Linac4, replacing Linac 2 in 2020, accelerates negative hydrogen ions which are then stripped of their electrons

== Linac ==
The Linac, some times referred to as the PS Linac and much later Linac 1, was CERN's first linear accelerator, built to inject 50 MeV protons into the Proton Synchrotron (PS). Conceived in the early 1950s, its principle design was based on a similar accelerator at AERE in England. The first beams were accelerated in 1958, at currents of 5 mA and a pulse length of 20 μs, which was the world record at that time. The accelerator was fully operational by September 1959, when the design energy of 50 MeV was first reached.

From then on, the Linac experienced a phase of rapid development and constant improvement of the output parameters. This culminated in 1978, when a maximal proton current of 70 mA at pulse lengths of 100 μs could be reached. From 1972 on, the Linac didn't deliver the protons directly to the PS anymore, but to the Proton Synchrotron Booster (PSB). The PSB had been built to allow for higher energies of the protons beams already before they enter the PS.

After Linac 2 had taken over the task of accelerating protons in 1978, the Linac continued to be used as a reliable testbed for new developments. This included the testing and implementation of a radio-frequency quadrupole as the initial accelerator, which replaced the original Cockcroft–Walton generator in 1984. Furthermore, ways to create and accelerate deuterons, α-particles and H^{−} atoms were developed. The latter were used as test beams for LEAR. From late 1986 on, the Linac was also used to accelerate oxygen and sulphur ions.

The Linac ceased to be used in experiments in summer of 1992. It was then decommissioned and removed from its tunnel to make room for Linac 3; the construction of which started October 1992 after the Linac had been removed from the tunnel. Parts of the Linac remain as museum pieces in the Microcosm exhibit.

== Linac 2 ==
Linac 2, in the beginning simply referred to as the new Linac was announced in 1973. It was decided to build a new linear accelerator, since the old Linac was unable to keep up with the technical advances of the other machines within CERN's accelerator complex. Linac 2 replaced the Linac as CERN's primary source of proton beams in 1978. It kept the same beam energy of 50 MeV, but allowed for more intense beams with beam currents of up to 150 mA and a longer pulse duration of 200 μs.

Originally, it had been discussed to further upgrade the first Linac instead of building a completely new linear accelerator. However, it quickly became clear that the costs of such an update would almost be as expensive as the new Linac. Another fact in favor of this new construction was the possibility to ensure a smooth transition from one Linac to the other without any downtime in between. Also this two linac approach meant that the old Linac could provide a back-up for the new Linac for the first years of operation.

Construction of Linac 2 started in December 1973, with an estimated budget of 21.3 million CHF, and was completed in 1978. Linac 2 was 36 meters long and was based at ground level at the main CERN site. It was located in a building parallel to the old Linac tunnel.

Throughout its lifetime, Linac 2 went through several updates to keep up with the advances of CERN's accelerator system. The most important upgrade was the replacement of the old 750 kV Cockcroft–Walton generator with a radio-frequency quadrupole in 1993. This raised the output current to 180 mA.

In the late 2000s, it was considered whether to upgrade Linac 2 or build a new linac for injecting particles into HL-LHC. The decision was in the end made to build a new accelerator, the Linac4 to succeed Linac 2 in 2020. Linac 2 was switched off 12 November 2018 at 15:00 by CERN's Director of Accelerators, and was subsequently decommissioned as part of the LHC Injector Upgrade project. In the decommissioning process, Linac 2 was disconnected from the other accelerators of CERN, so it can no longer used to inject particles into CERN accelerators or experiments. However, much of the Linac 2 accelerator hardware is left (as of October 2023) in place, and can now be visited as part of a guided tour.

== Linac 3 ==
Linac 3, also referred to as the Lead Linac was constructed inside the former tunnel of Linac 1 and got commissioned in the summer of 1994 (construction started October 1992). It had been specially constructed to accelerate heavy ions, after tests with Linac 1 and an increasing demand from the scientific community suggested to build a new Linac dedicated specifically to this task. The accelerated particles are mainly lead ions, which are provided to the LHC and fixed target experiments at the SPS and LEIR. For LEIR's commissioning, also oxygen ions were accelerated.

After preparations from 2013 on, Linac 3 was adapted to accelerate argon ions in 2015. These were used by the NA61/SHINE experiment.

Similarly, Linac 3 accelerated xenon ions in 2017 for NA61's fixed-target physics programme. On October 12, 2017, these were delivered to the Large Hadron Collider (LHC) for a unique run of data taking: For the first time, xenon ions were accelerated and collided in the LHC. For six hours, LHC's four experiments could take data of the colliding xenon ions.

Linac 3 is expected to stay in use at least until 2022.

== Linac 4 ==
Linac 4 is a current 86 metre-long linear accelerator that replaced the retired Linac 2. Unlike its predecessors, Linac 4 accelerates negative hydrogen ions, not protons, and has an acceleration energy of 160 MeV. The ions are then injected to the Proton Synchrotron Booster (PSB) where both electrons are then stripped from each of the hydrogen ions and thus only the nucleus containing one proton remains. By using hydrogen ions instead of protons, the beam loss at the injection is reduced and simplified and this also allows more particles to accumulate in the synchrotron.

CERN approved the construction of Linac 4 in June 2007. Project started in 2008.

Linac 4 has been built in its own tunnel, parallel to Linac 2, in the main CERN site. The reason for building the accelerator in its own new tunnel is that its building could take place simultaneously with the operation of Linac 2.

Linac 4 has increased the energy by a factor of three over its predecessor, Linac 2, and achieve an energy of 160 MeV. This energy increase, when combined with the increased accumulation of particles, has allowed the intensity of the beams for LHC to almost double. This is part of the planned future luminosity increase of the LHC.

The first injection of a particle beam from Linac 4 into the PSB occurred in December 2020.
