= Proton Synchrotron Booster =

CERN particle accelerator

CERN Complex

Current particle and nuclear facilities
- LHC: Accelerates protons and heavy ions
- LEIR: Accelerates ions
- SPS: Accelerates protons and ions
- PSB: Accelerates protons
- PS: Accelerates protons or ions
- Linac 3: Injects heavy ions into LEIR
- Linac4: Accelerates ions
- AD: Decelerates antiprotons
- ELENA: Decelerates antiprotons
- ISOLDE: Produces radioactive ion beams
- MEDICIS: Produces isotopes for medical purposes

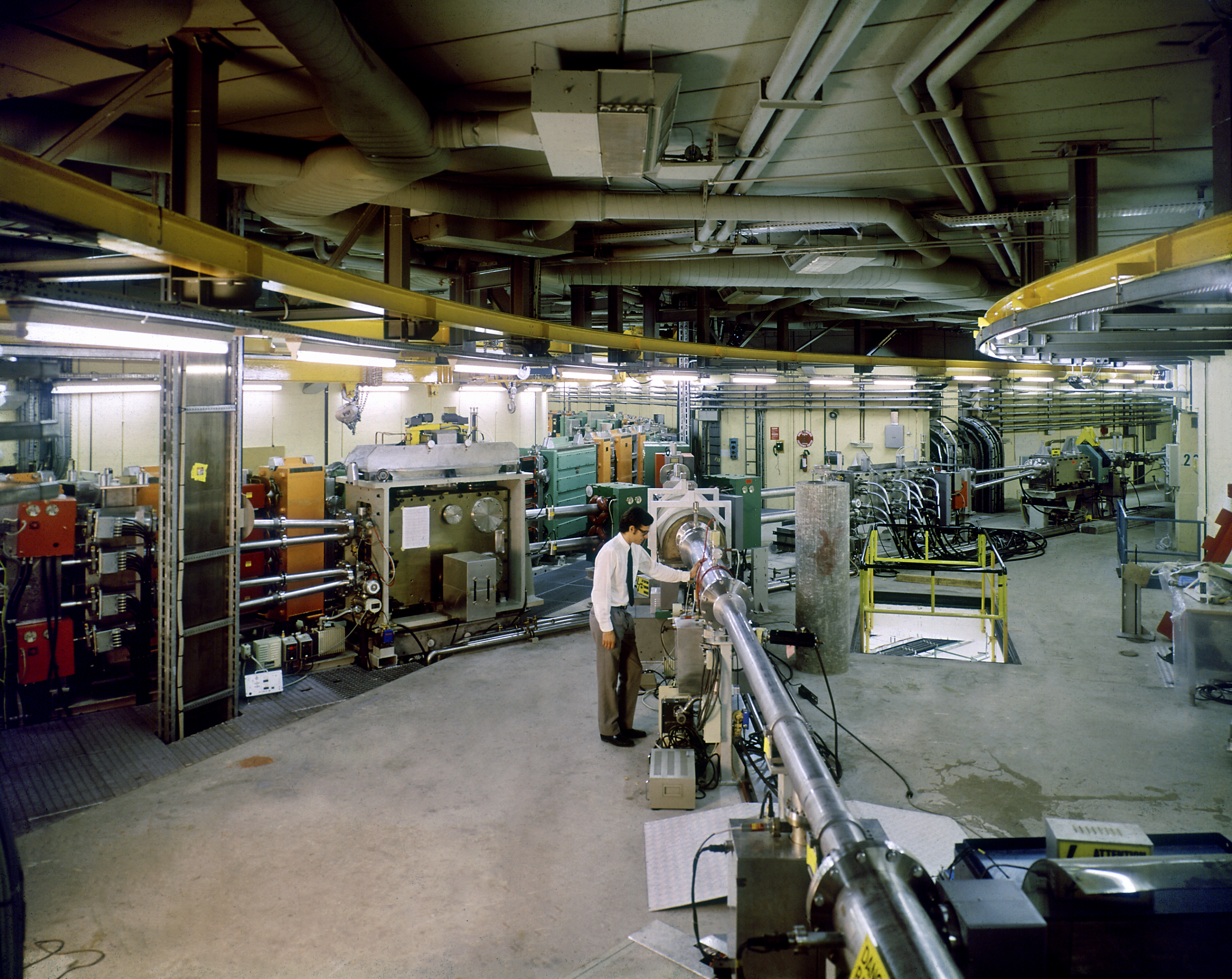
Injection and transfer lines of the Proton Synchrotron Booster

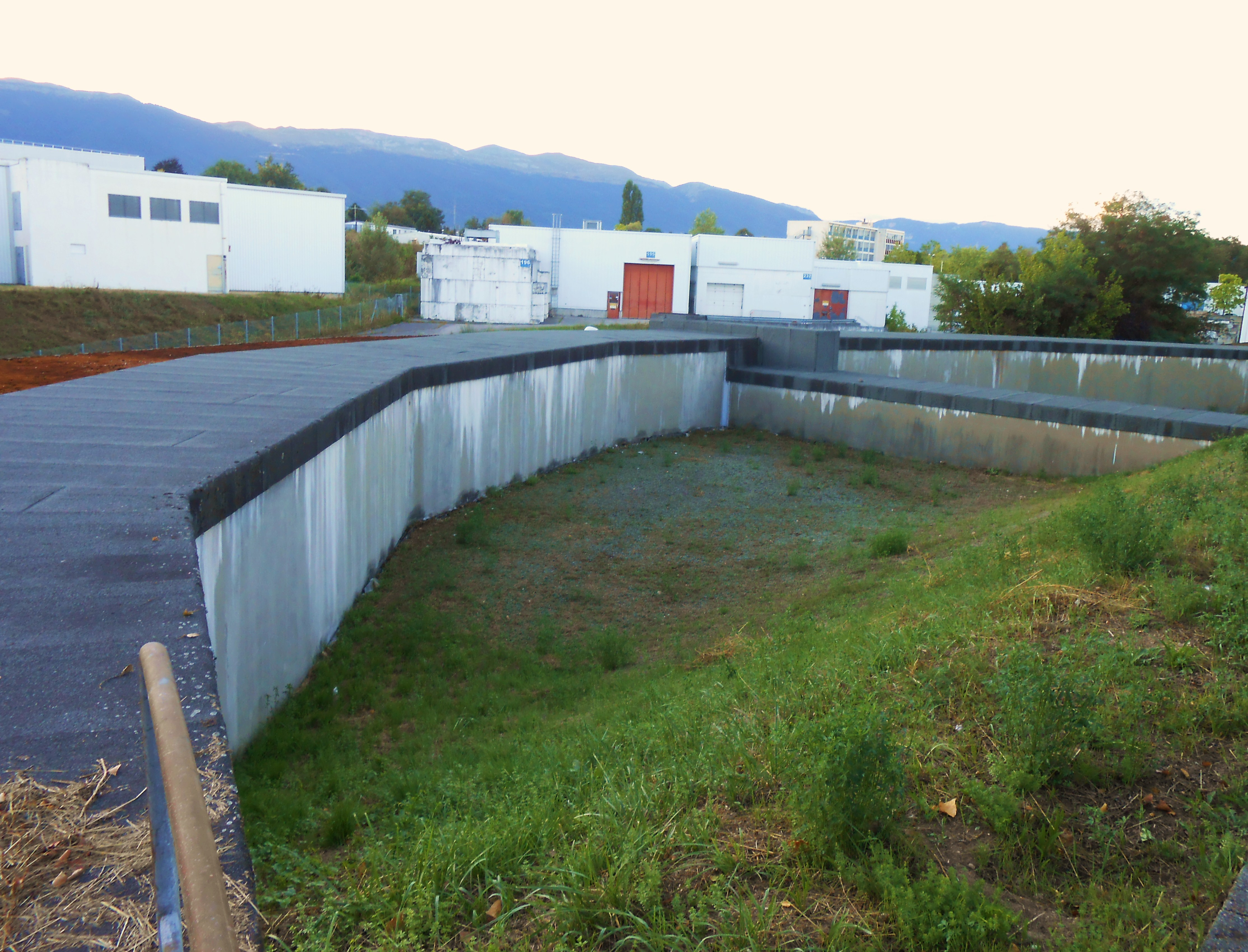
The surface above the PS Booster at CERN. The ring-shaped accelerator is visible as a circular building that rises from the ground.

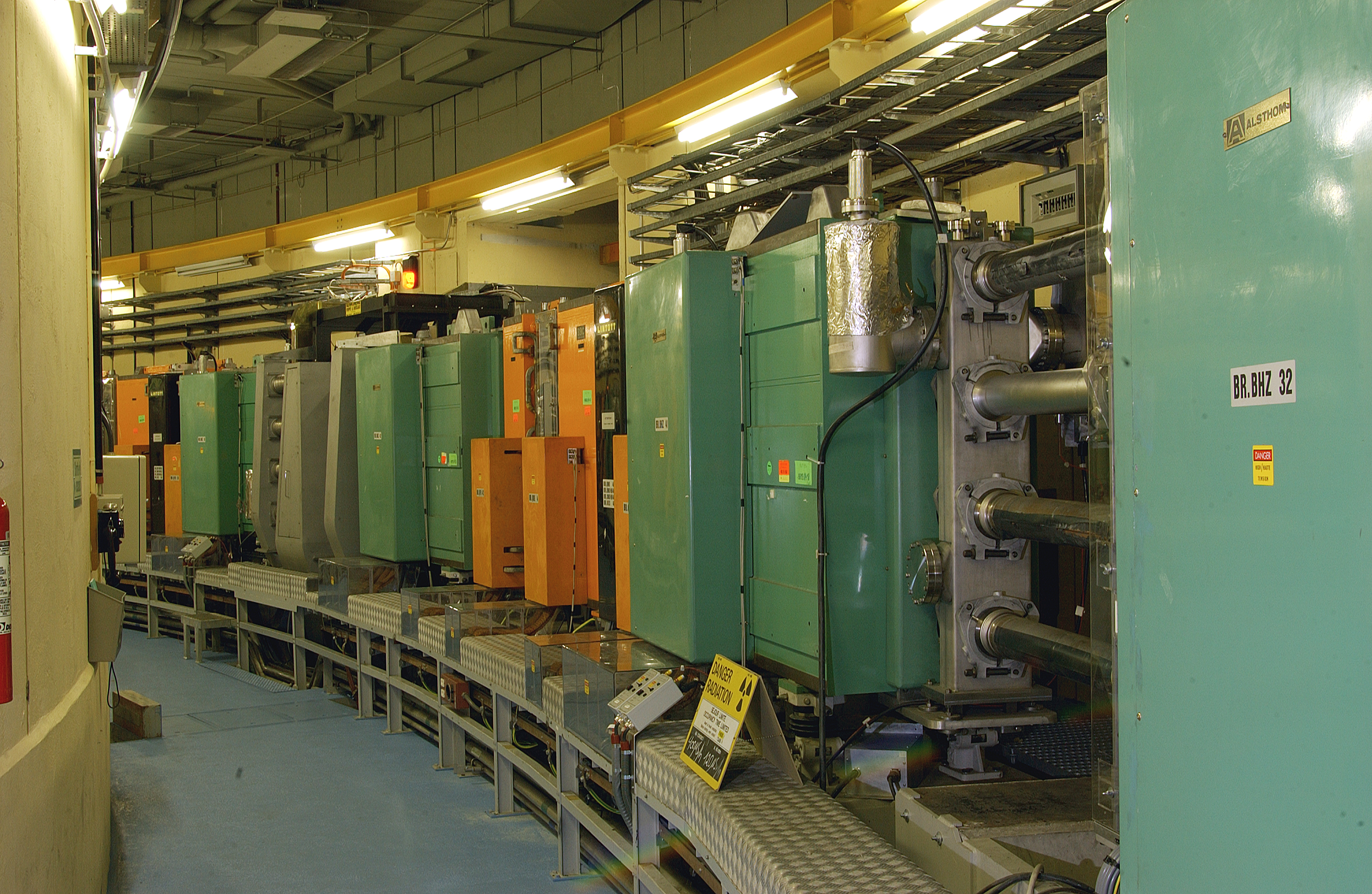
The Proton Synchrotron Booster in its tunnel

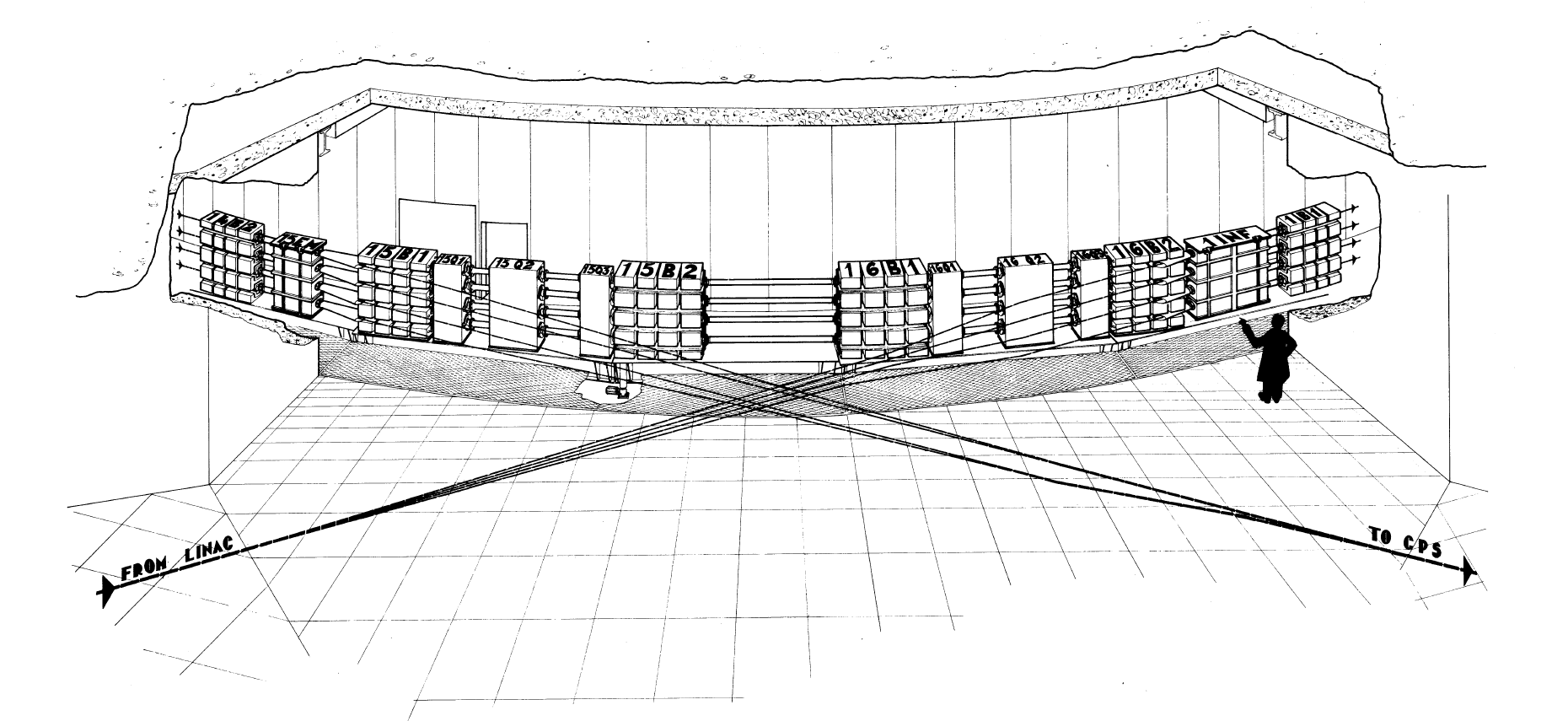
Artist's impression of the Proton Synchrotron Booster

The Proton Synchrotron Booster (PSB) is the first and smallest circular proton accelerator (a synchrotron) in the accelerator chain at the CERN injection complex, which also provides beams to the Large Hadron Collider. It contains four superimposed rings with a radius of 25 meters, which receive protons with an energy of 160 MeV from the linear accelerator Linac4 and accelerate them up to 2.0 GeV, ready to be injected into the Proton Synchrotron (PS). Before the PSB was built in 1972, Linac 1 injected directly into the Proton Synchrotron, but the increased injection energy provided by the booster allowed for more protons to be injected into the PS and a higher luminosity at the end of the accelerator chain.

The PSB does not only act as a proton injector for the PS but also provides protons at an energy of 1.4 GeV to On-Line Isotope Mass Separator (ISOLDE), the only experimental facility directly linked to the PSB.

== Historical background ==
=== 1964–1968: Planning and start of construction ===
Before the PSB became operational in 1972, the protons were directly delivered to the Proton Synchrotron (PS) by the linear accelerator Linac 1, providing the PS with protons of 50 MeV, which were then accelerated by the PS to 25 GeV at beam intensities of approximately 10^{12} protons per pulse. However, with the development of new experiments (mainly at the Intersecting Storage Rings ISR), the demanded beam intensities in the order of 10^{13} protons per pulse exceeded the capabilities of this setup. Therefore, different approaches on how to increase the beam energy already before the protons enter the PS were discussed.

Different suggestions for this new PS injector were made, for example another linear accelerator or five intersecting synchrotron rings inspired by the shape of the Olympic rings. Eventually, it was decided to go for a setup of four vertically stacked synchrotron rings with a radius of 25 meters, which was proposed in 1964. With this special design, it would become possible to reach the aspired intensities of more than 10^{13} protons per pulse.

In 1967, the budget of the overall update program was estimated to be 69.5 million CHF (1968 prices). More than half of this sum was devoted to the construction of the PSB, which started one year later, in 1968.

=== 1972–1974: First beam and start-up ===
The first proton beams in the PSB were accelerated on May 1, 1972, and the nominal energy of 800 MeV was reached on May 26. In October 1973, the intermediate intensity goal of 5.2 $\times$ 10^{12} protons per pulse delivered to the PS was reached. In total, it took around two years to achieve the design intensity of 10^{13} protons per pulse.

=== 1973–1978: Update to Linac 2 ===
During the first years of operation, it became clear that the linear accelerator Linac 1, CERN's primary proton source at that time, was unable to keep up with the technical advances of the other machines within the accelerator complex. Therefore, it was decided in 1963 to build a new linear accelerator, which would later be called Linac 2. This new machine would provide protons with the same energy as before (50 MeV), but with higher beam currents of up to 150 mA and a longer pulse duration of 200 μs. Construction of Linac 2 started in December 1973 and was completed in 1978.

Linac 1 continued to operate as a source of light ions up to 1992.

=== 1988: Upgrade to 1 GeV ===
After more than ten years of operation, the constant increase of the beam intensity also demanded an increase in output energy of the PSB. Therefore, with only minor hardware adjustments, the PSB was upgraded to 1 GeV in 1988.

=== 1980s–2003: Accelerating ions ===
From the beginning of the 1980s until 2003, the PSB was also used to accelerate light ions like oxygen or alpha-particles, which were delivered by Linac 1. After Linac 3 as a dedicated ion linear accelerator became operational, also heavy ions such as lead and indium were accelerated by the PSB.

From 2006 on, the Low Energy Ion Ring (LEIR) took over PSB's former task of accelerating ions.

=== 1992: Connection to ISOLDE experiment ===
Up to 1992, the only machine that used the output protons from the PSB was the PS. This changed in 1992, when the On-Line Isotope Mass Separator (ISOLDE) became the second recipient of PSB's protons. Before, ISOLDE had obtained protons from the Synchro-Cyclotron, but this machine had reached the end of its lifetime by the end of the 1980s. Thus, it was decided in 1989 to connect ISOLDE to the PSB.

=== 1999: Preparation for the LHC and upgrade to 1.4 GeV ===
With the Large Hadron Collider (LHC) at the horizon, another upgrade of the PSB to 1.4 GeV was necessary. This upgrade implied more severe adjustments of the hardware than the previous upgrade to 1 GeV, because the limits of PSB's design parameters had been reached. In 2000, the upgrade was completed.

=== 2010–2026: Future upgrades for the High Luminosity Large Hadron Collider ===
In 2010, the cornerstone for another upgrade of the LHC was laid: the High Luminosity Large Hadron Collider.

The much higher required beam intensity made it necessary to increase the PSB's output energy to 2.0 GeV. This was implemented during Long Shutdown 2 (2019–2020) by the exchange and update of various key equipment of the PSB, for example the main power supply, the radio-frequency system, the transfer line to the PS and the cooling system.

Additionally, the input energy of the PSB has been increased: Linac4, provides an output beam energy of 160 MeV, replacing Linac2. Linac4 enables the PSB to provide higher quality beam for the LHC by using hydrogen anions (H^{−} ions) rather than bare protons (H^{+} ions). A stripping foil at the PSB injection point will strip the electrons off the hydrogen anions, thus creating protons that are accumulated as beam bunches in the four PSB rings. These proton bunches are then recombined at the exit of the PSB and further transferred down the CERN injector chain.

== Setup and operation ==
The PSB is part of CERN's accelerator complex. By the time it was constructed, the Meyrin campus had just been enlarged, now covering French territory as well. The center of PSB's rings sits directly on the border between France and Switzerland. Due to the countries’ different regulations regarding buildings at the border, it was decided to build the main PSB construction underground. The only visible PSB infrastructure is located on the Swiss side. The PSB consists of four vertically stacked rings with a radius of 25 meters. Each ring is sectioned into 16 periods with two dipole magnets per period and a triplet focusing structure made up of three quadrupole magnets (focusing, defocusing, focusing). Every magnet structure consists of four single magnets for the four rings stacked on top of each other, sharing one yoke.

Since the PSB consists of four rings in contrast to only one beamline in Linac 2 and one ring in the PS, a special construction is necessary to couple the proton beams in and out. The proton beam coming from Linac 2 is split up vertically into four different beams by the so-called proton distributor: The beam travels through a series of pulsed magnets, which successively deflect parts of the incoming beam to different angles. This results in four beamlets filling the four rings, as well as the rising and falling edge of the proton pulse, which get dumped after the proton distributor.

Similarly, the four beamlets are merged again after they have gotten accelerated by the PSB. With a series of different magnetic structures, the beams from the four rings are brought to one vertical level and are then directed towards the PS.

In 2017, 1.51×10^{20} protons were accelerated by the PSB. 61.45% of those were delivered to ISOLDE, and only a small fraction of 0.084% were used by the LHC.

== Results and discoveries ==
The only direct experiment that is fed by PSB's protons is the On-Line Isotope Mass Separator (ISOLDE). There, the protons are used to create different types of low-energy radioactive nuclei. With these, a wide variety of experiments ranging from nuclear and atomic physics to solid state physics and life sciences are conducted. In 2010, the MEDICIS facility was initiated as part of ISOLDE, which uses leftover protons from ISOLDE targets to produce radioisotopes suitable for medical purposes.
