= Low Energy Ion Ring =

Particle accelerator at CERN

CERN Complex

Current particle and nuclear facilities
- LHC: Accelerates protons and heavy ions
- LEIR: Accelerates ions
- SPS: Accelerates protons and ions
- PSB: Accelerates protons
- PS: Accelerates protons or ions
- Linac 3: Injects heavy ions into LEIR
- Linac4: Accelerates ions
- AD: Decelerates antiprotons
- ELENA: Decelerates antiprotons
- ISOLDE: Produces radioactive ion beams
- MEDICIS: Produces isotopes for medical purposes

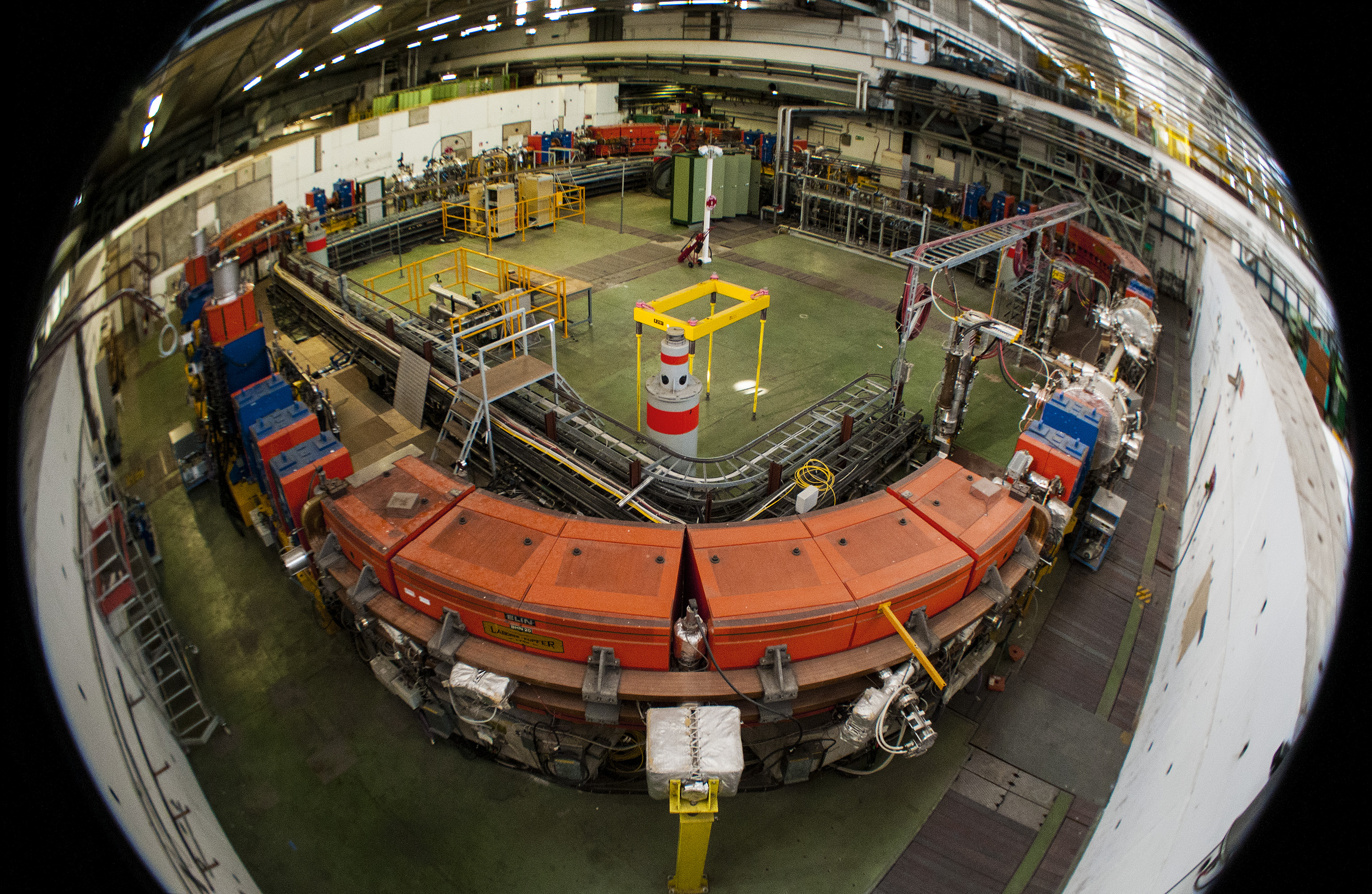
The Low Energy Ion Ring particle accelerator at CERN

The Low Energy Ion Ring (LEIR) is a particle accelerator at CERN used to accelerate ions from the LINAC 3 to the Proton Synchrotron (PS) to provide ions for collisions within the Large Hadron Collider (LHC).

== History ==
LEIR was converted from a previous machine, the Low Energy Antiproton Ring (LEAR), a facility to decelerate and store antiprotons and to deliver them to experiments; the last LEAR antiproton run took place in 1996. LEIR was first proposed in 1993 but it wasn't until 2003 that work to transform the old experiment into the new accelerator was started. The upgrade took just over two years, being commissioned in October 2005 and tested for 4 months. In Autumn 2006 it was used to re-commission the PS to handle ions, and then again a year later it was used to re-commission the SPS. However, it wasn't until November 2010, five years later, that it successfully carried out its primary role to provide the lead ions to the LHC for its first ion collisions.

During 2017, LEIR was running with xenon ions, sending them normally to SPS and, exceptionally to the LHC for one day of physics. In 2018, the machine was running again with lead ions and had the objective to reach an LIU performance of more than 9×10^{10} charges extracted. On 6 June 2018 that performance was achieved and also a new extraction record of 10.35×10^{10} charges was accomplished.

== Operation ==
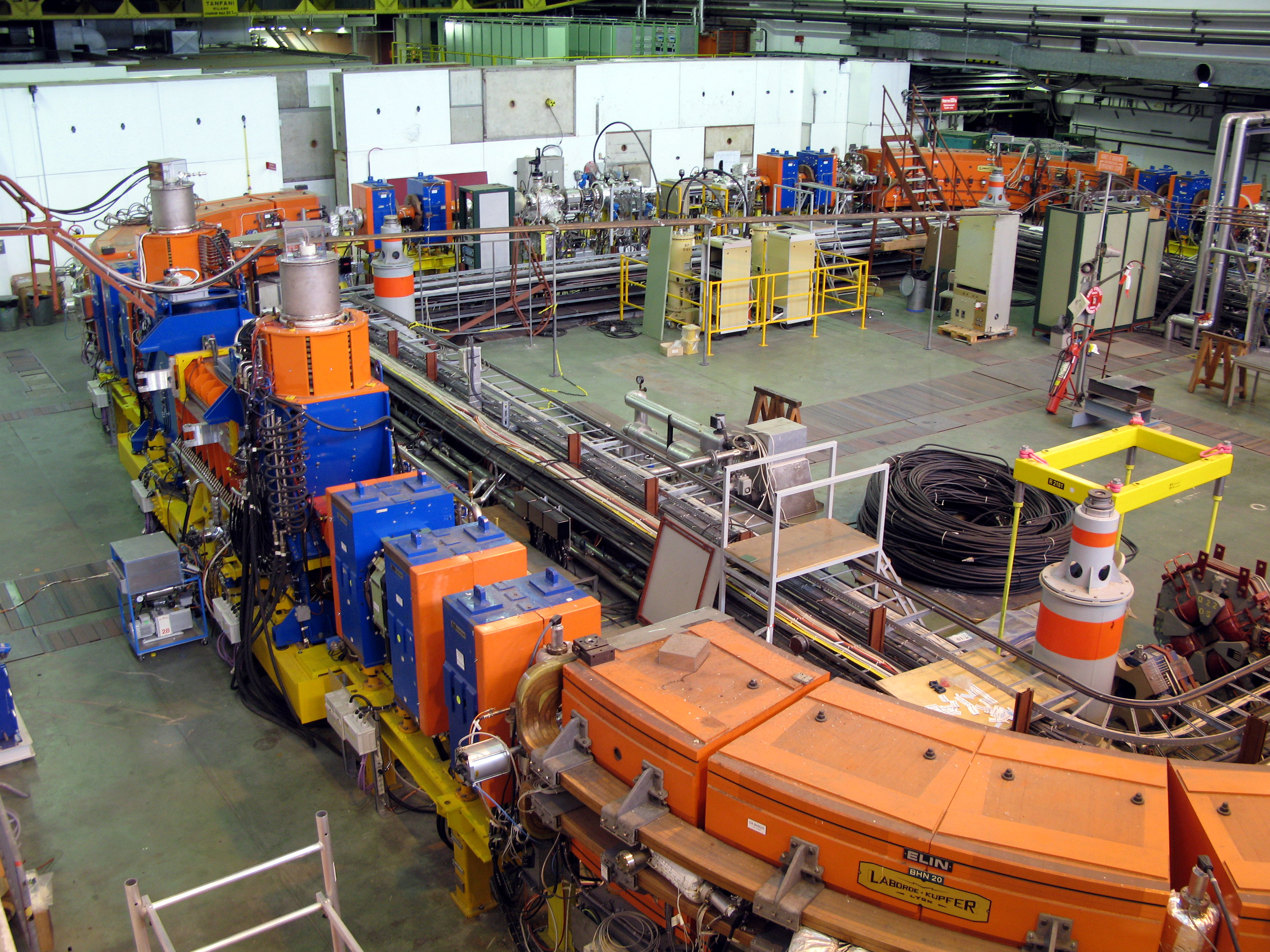
Electron cooler (left) at LEIR. The electron source and dump are installed in the upper metallic cylinders.

LEIR takes long bunches of lead-208 ions from the LINAC 3, and splits them into 4 bunches. Each bunch contains 2.2×10^{8} lead ions, which are accelerated from 4.2 MeV per nucleon to 72 MeV per nucleon before passing them through to the PS for storage.

The most important function of LEIR is not acceleration, but electron cooling to reduce the emittance of the ion beam in order to maintain high luminosity of the final LHC beam. Each group of two bunches takes about 2.5 seconds to accelerate and cool, so with the LHC using 592 bunches of ions, it takes around 10 minutes for a complete fill of the LHC for operations.
