= LHC Accelerator Research Program =

The LHC Accelerator Research Program (LARP) coordinates research and development in the United States related to the Large Hadron Collider at CERN. Among other things, the program has contributed important instrumentation for initial LHC operation and is leading the way for the development of superconducting magnets based on Niobium-tin, which are proposed for future LHC upgrades.

LARP was first proposed in 2003 as a collaboration between the Brookhaven National Laboratory, the Fermi National Accelerator Laboratory, and the Lawrence Berkeley National Laboratory. The SLAC National Accelerator Laboratory joined the program shortly thereafter.

LARP is funded through the U.S. Department of Energy. The total funding in Fiscal Year 2010 was $12.39M, distributed among the four labs involved.
