= CERN-MEDICIS =

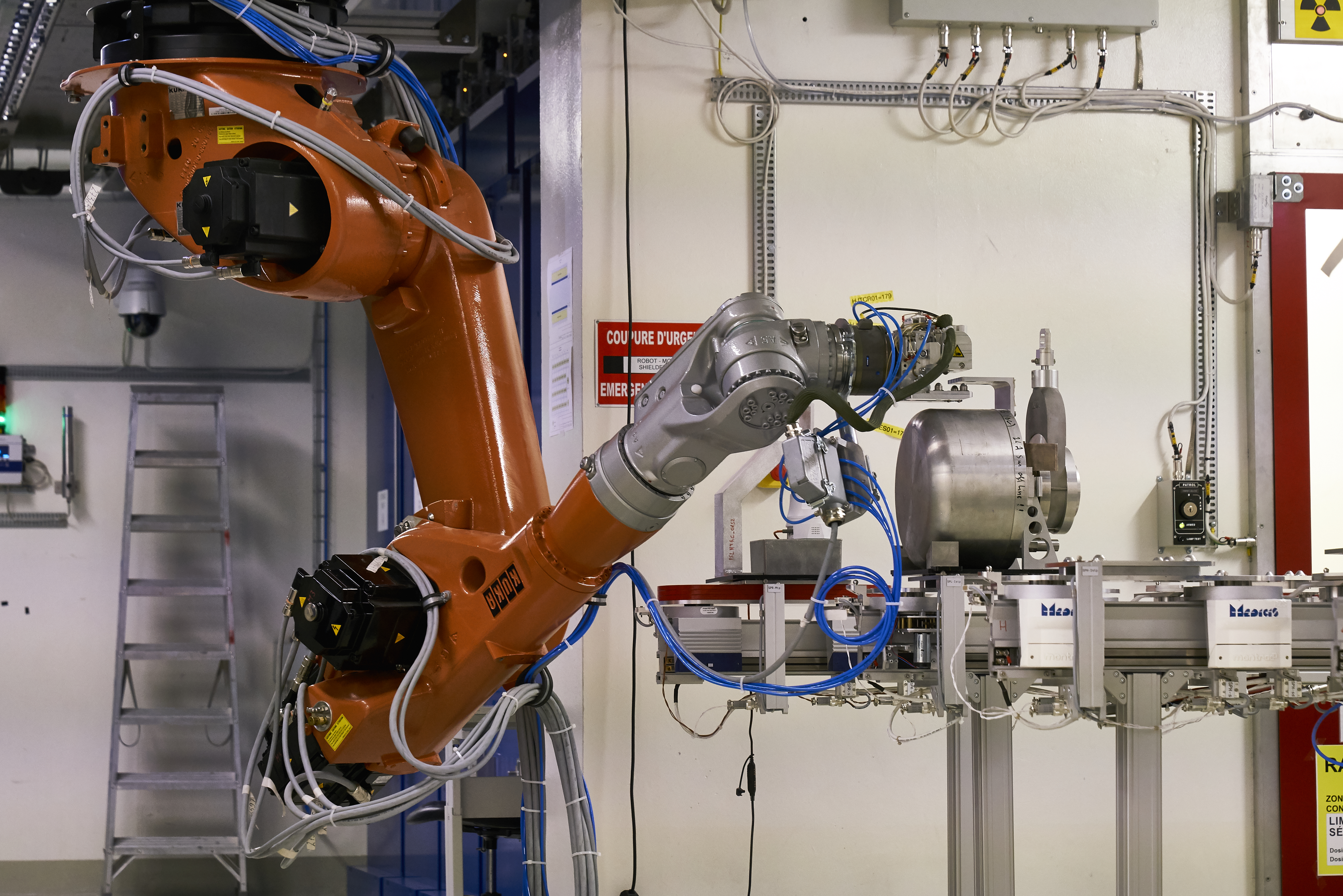
CERN-MEDICIS robot isotope production for medical research

CERN-MEDical Isotopes Collected from ISOLDE (MEDICIS) is a facility located in the Isotope Separator Online DEvice (ISOLDE) facility at CERN, designed to produce high-purity isotopes for developing the practice of patient diagnosis and treatment. The facility was initiated in 2010, with its first radioisotopes (terbium-155) produced on 12 December 2017.

The target used to produce radioactive nuclei at the ISOLDE facility only absorbs 10% of the proton beam. MEDICIS positions a second target behind the first, which is irradiated by the leftover 90% of the proton beam. The target is then moved to an off-line mass separation system and isotopes are extracted from the target. These isotopes are implanted in metallic foil and can be delivered to research facilities and hospitals.

MEDICIS is a nuclear class A laboratory and takes into account various radioprotection procedures to prevent irradiation and contamination.

== Background ==
An isotope of an element contains the same number of protons, but a different number of neutrons, giving it a different mass number than the element found on the periodic table. Isotopes with a large variation in nucleon number will decay into more stable nuclei, and are known as radionuclides or radioisotopes.

The field of nuclear medicine uses radioisotopes to diagnose and treat patients. The radiation and particles emitted by these radioisotopes can be used to weaken or destroy target cells, for example in the case of cancer. For diagnosis, a radioactive dose is given to a patient and its activity can be tracked to study the functionality of a target organ. The tracers used within this process are generally short-lived isotopes.

Diagnostic radiopharmaceuticals are used to examine organ functionality, blood flow, bone growth and other diagnostic procedures. Radioisotopes needed for this procedure must emit gamma radiation with a high energy and short half-life, in order for it to escape the body and decay quickly. There is currently a trend to use cyclotron-produced isotopes as they are becoming more widely available.

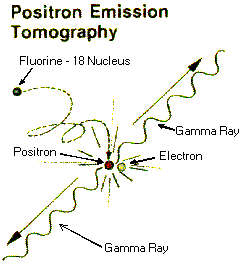
Positron Emission of Fluorine-18

Positron emission tomography (PET) is an imaging technique, using radioisotopes also most often produced with a cyclotron. They are injected into the patient, accumulating in the target tissue, and decays through positron emission. The positron annihilates with an electron nearby which results in the emission to two gamma rays (photons) in opposite directions. A PET camera detects these rays and can determine quantitative information about the target tissue.

Therapeutic radiopharmaceuticals are used to destroy or weaken malfunctioning cells, using a radioisotope localised to a specific organ. This process is called radionuclide therapy (RNT), and uses heavy proton radioisotopes (located on the North-West area of the nuclide chart) that decay through beta or alpha emission.

== Facility and process ==
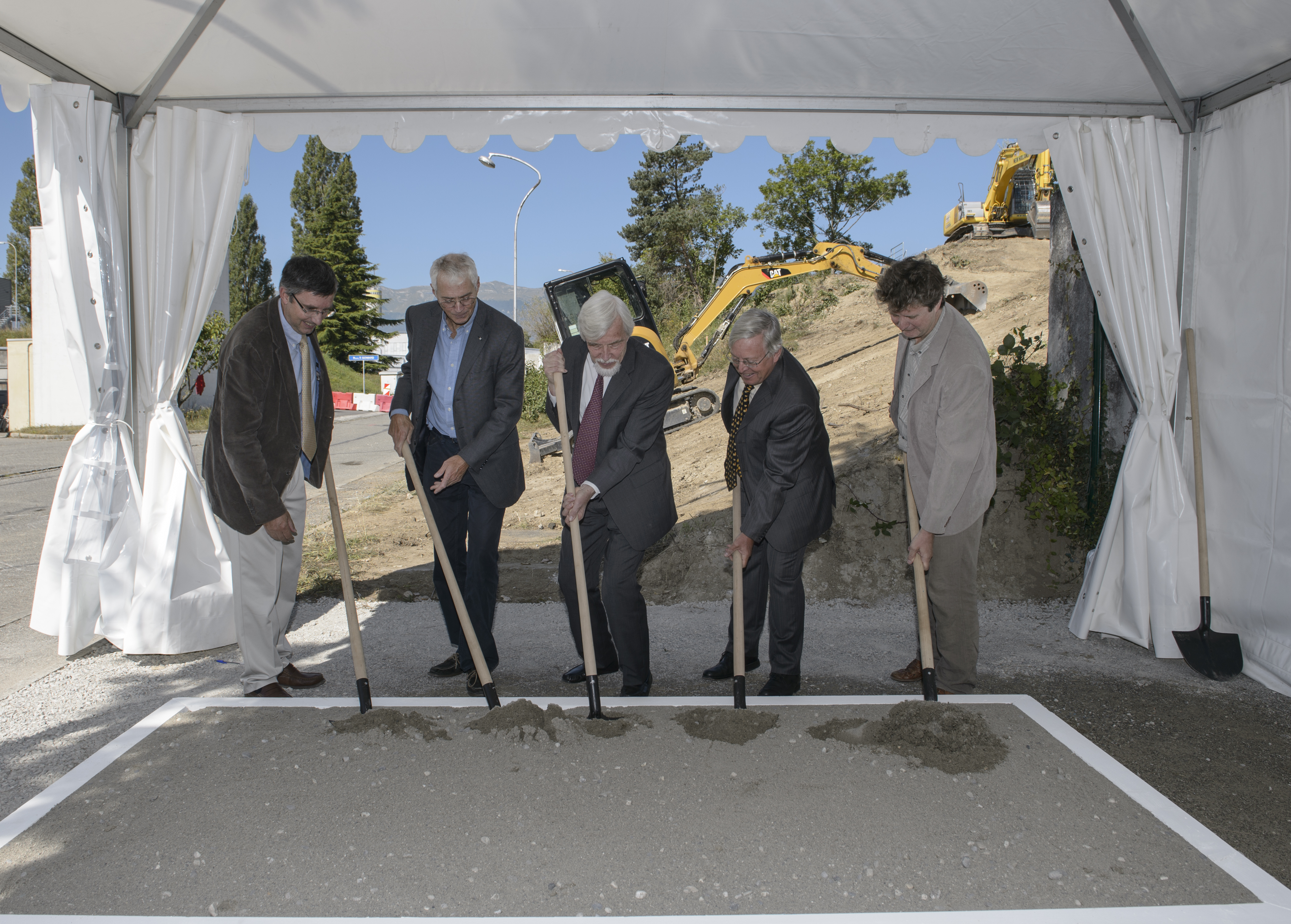
MEDICIS announcement of initial construction in 2013

The MEDICIS facility is located in the extension of building 179 at the CERN Meyrin site, next to the ISOLDE building. The facility was established by CERN in 2010, along with contributions from the CERN Knowledge Transfer Fund, as well as receiving a European Commission Marie-Skłodowska-Curie training grant under the title MEDICIS-PROMED. The construction of the facility started in September 2013 and was completed in 2017.

ISOLDE directs a 1.4 GeV proton beam from the Proton Synchrotron Booster (PSB) onto a thick target, the material dependent on the desired produced isotopes. Only 10% of the proton beam used in the ISOLDE facility is absorbed by the target, with the rest otherwise hitting the beam dump. MEDICIS uses these wasted protons to irradiate a second target, which produces specific isotopes, placed behind each of ISOLDE's target stations, the High Resolution Separator (HRS) and the General Purpose Separator (GPS). Alternatively, the facility uses pre-irradiated targets that are provided by external institutions. MEDICIS was one of the few facilities operating throughout the Long Shutdown 2, due to it being provided with 34 externally irradiated target materials.

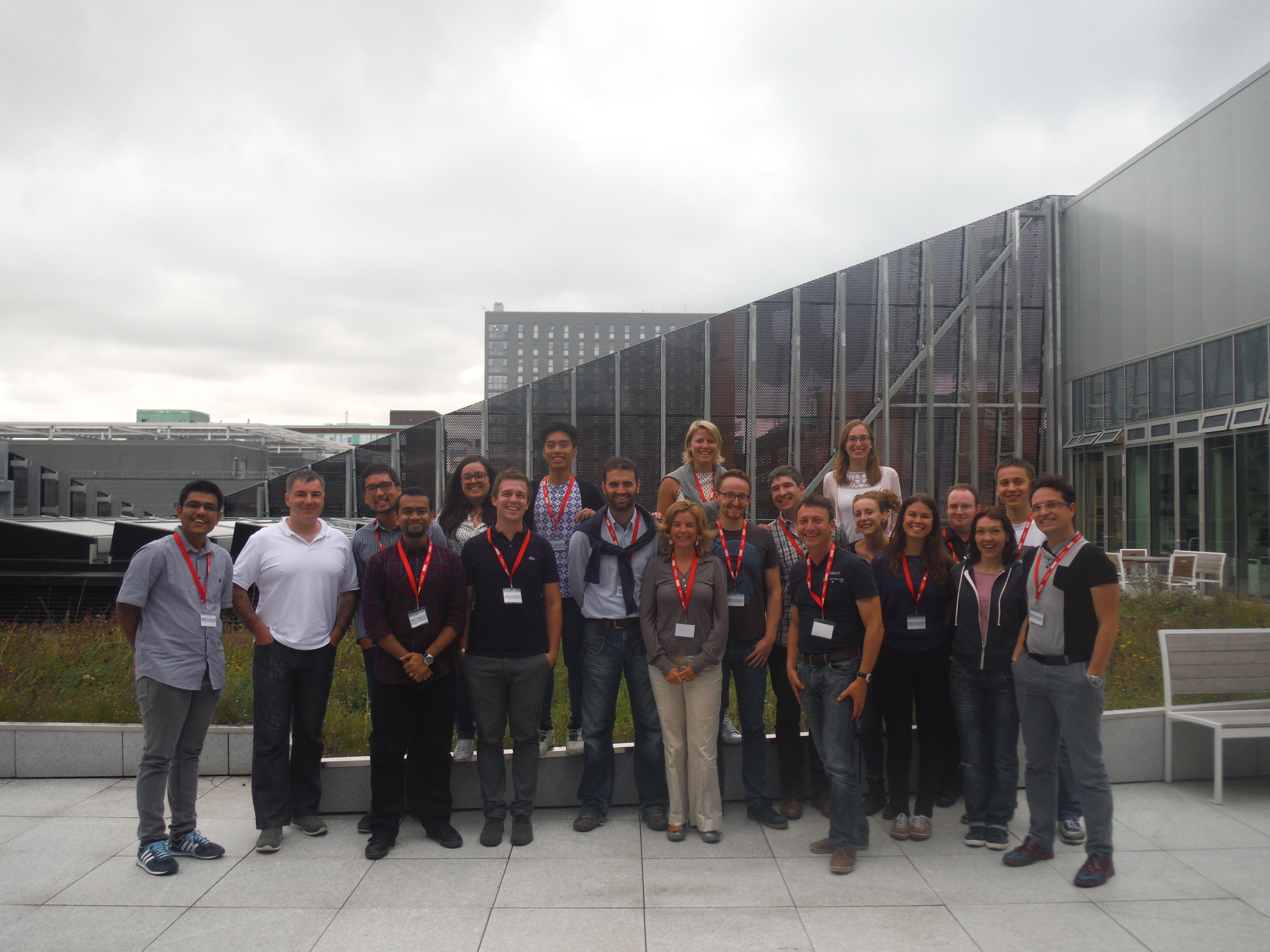
MEDICIS Promed training with Nobel prize winner, Kostya Novozelov

Due to the high levels of radiation, the targets are transferred from the irradiation station to the radioisotope mass-separation beamline using an automated rail conveyer system (RCS). A KUKA robot is used to transport the target to the station, where the isotope of interest can be collected and radiochemically purified. This is done by heating the target up to very high temperatures, often more than 2000 °C, which causes the specified isotopes to diffuse. The isotopes are then ionised and accelerated by an ion source to be sent through a mass separator. The mass separator extracts the isotope of interest so that it can be implanted onto thin gold foils with a one-sided metallic or salt coating.

In 2019, the MEDICIS Laser Ion Source Setup At CERN (MELISSA) became fully operational, containing the individual lasers, auxiliary and control systems, and optical beam transport. The MELISSA laser laboratory has helped to successfully increase the separation efficiency and the yield of the isotopes. The laser excites only isotopes of the desired element, allowing an element-selective isotope separation for a given atomic mass from other isobars by the mass separator.

A shielded trolley is used to retrieve the samples after the radioisotopes have been collected, in order to avoid risk of contamination. Once the target is finished being used, it is sent to a hot cell in order to be safely dismantled and put in waste bins.

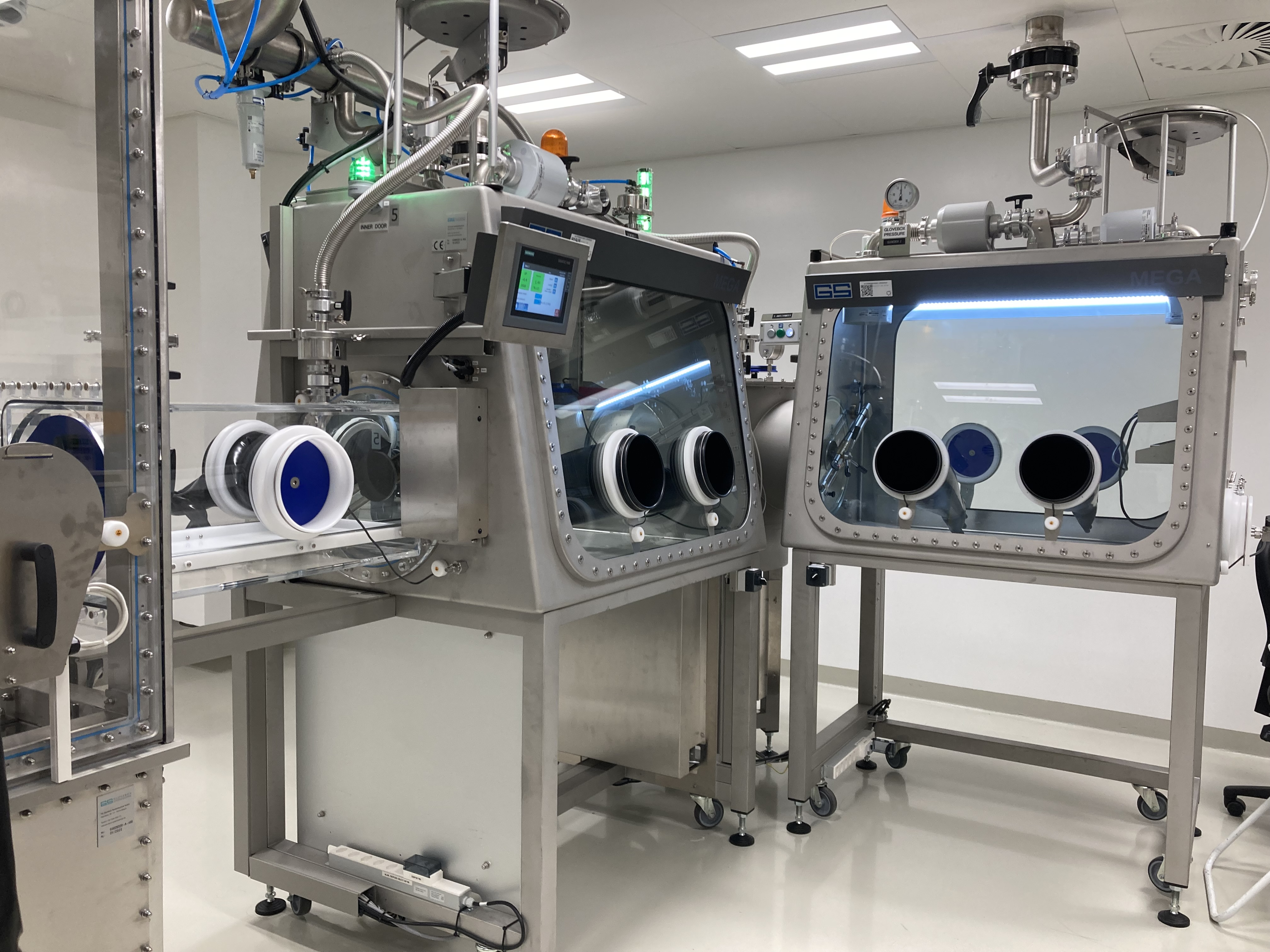
Glovebox at the nanolaboratory at MEDICIS

Once collected, the samples can be sent to hospitals and research facilities with the purpose of developing patient imaging and treatment, and therapy protocols.

Additionally next to the MEDICIS facility, there is a nanolab laboratory designed for the development and assembly of nanomaterials. The nanomaterials are sealed in a glovebox, meaning there is no contact with the outside environment. It builds up on the development of the first nanostructured targets used for isotope production, and further exploits developments initiated in MEDICIS-Promed under the guidance of Prof. "Kostya" Novozelov.

== Projects and results ==
=== Targeted therapy ===
Several lanthanides produced at CERN-MEDICIS, samarium and terbium, are of interest for targeted therapy alike lutetium already used in the clinics. Lutetium emits low energy β particles with a short range, used for irradiation of smaller volume tumor targets. Terbium-149 emits short-range alpha particles, gamma-rays and positrons, in its decay scheme, which makes it suitable for targeted alpha therapy. The particular study of ^{149}Tb produced by ISOLDE has been in folate receptor therapy, prominent in ovarian and lung cancer.

^{153}Sm, produced in the BR2 reactor at SCK CEN, followed by the subsequent mass separation by MEDICIS to increase its molar activity, was found to be suitable for targeted radionuclide therapy (TRNT) in a proof-of-concept research project. It emits low energy β particles and gamma peaks, and presents acceptable half-life for logistics and ambulatory care, making it a candidate of choice for theranostics approaches.

=== Theranostics ===
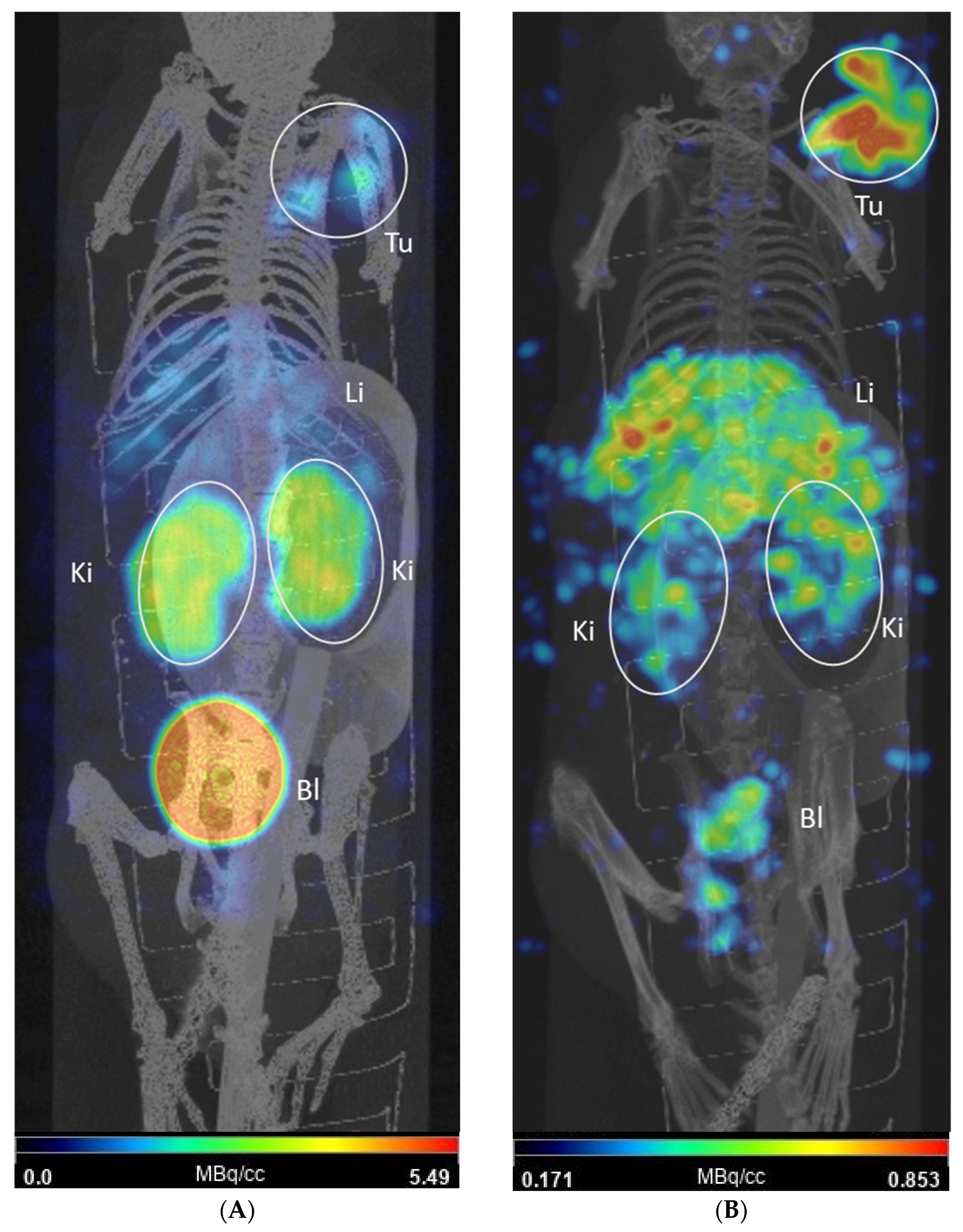
SPECT-CT images at (a) 4h post injection and (b) 24h post injection

Theranostics, a treatment that combines therapy and diagnosis, is a new trend in precision medicine where the radioisotopes produced at MEDICIS already triggered research projects. The strategy the facility uses is to find an element that has two radioisotopes, used for imaging and therapy separately.

A promising element for use in theranostics is terbium as it has four different radioisotopes for use in therapy and PET or SPECT imaging. In 2021, Tb radioisotope production was successfully performed with the MELISSA laser ion source, with a 53% ionisation efficiency obtained by MEDICIS-Promed students. Since 2021, three other non-conventional isotopes of interest for PET imaging or therapeutic applications have been produced.

Exploration of mass separated ^{153}Sm at MEDICIS using in vitro biological studies showed that the ability for tumors to absorb (uptake) and retain substances (retention) was improved compared to normal tissues. Animal SPECT-CT scans of mice were obtained post-injection and showed cleared activity after twenty-four hours.

== Involvement with PRISMAP ==
The PRoduction of high purity Isotopes by mass Separation for Medical APplication (PRISMAP) is the European medical radionuclide programme, with the goal to provide a sustainable source of high-purity radioisotopes for medicine. The programme brings together 23 beneficiaries from 13 countries, to create a single entry point for the medical isotope user community. The MEDICIS facility provides mass separation of isotopes, which can then be transported to nearby research facilities hosting external researchers to limit long haul transport of the samples.
