= List of accelerators in particle physics =

List compiling of particle accelerators used for particle physics experiments

A list of particle accelerators used for particle physics experiments. Some early particle accelerators that more properly did nuclear physics, but existed prior to the separation of particle physics from that field, are also included. Although a modern accelerator complex usually has several stages of accelerators, only accelerators whose output has been used directly for experiments are listed.

== Early accelerators ==
These all used single beams with fixed targets. They tended to have very briefly run, inexpensive, and unnamed experiments.

=== Cyclotrons ===
Accelerator	Location	Years of operation	Shape	Accelerated Particle	Kinetic Energy	Notes and discoveries made
9-inch cyclotron	University of California, Berkeley	1931	Circular	H^{+}_{2}	1.0 MeV	Proof of concept
11-inch cyclotron	University of California, Berkeley	1932	Circular	Proton	1.2 MeV	
27-inch cyclotron	University of California, Berkeley	1932–1936	Circular	Deuteron	4.8 MeV	Investigated deuteron-nucleus interactions
37-inch cyclotron	University of California, Berkeley	1937–1938	Circular	Deuteron	8 MeV	Discovered many isotopes
60-inch cyclotron	University of California, Berkeley	1939–1962^{[1]}	Circular	Deuteron	16 MeV	Discovered many isotopes.
88-inch cyclotron	Berkeley Rad Lab, now Lawrence Berkeley National Laboratory	1961–present	Circular (Isochronous)	Hydrogen through uranium	MeV to several GeV	Discovered many isotopes. Verified two element discoveries. Performed the world's first single event effects radiation testing in 1979, and tested parts and materials for most US spacecraft since then.
184-inch cyclotron	Berkeley Rad Lab	1942–1993	Circular	Various	MeV to GeV	Research on uranium isotope separation
Calutrons	Y-12 Plant, Oak Ridge, TN	1943–	"Horseshoe"	Uranium nuclei		Used to separate Uranium 235 isotope for the Manhattan Project, after the end of World War II used for separation of medical and other isotopes.
95-inch cyclotron	Harvard Cyclotron Laboratory	1949–2002	Circular	Proton	160 MeV	Used for nuclear physics 1949 – ~ 1961, development of clinical proton therapy until 2002
37-inch cyclotron	Oregon State University	1954–(unknown)	Circular	Proton	20 MeV	
37-inch cyclotron	Oregon State University	1954–(unknown)	Circular	^{3}He	27 MeV	
JULIC	Forschungszentrum Jülich, Germany	1967–present	Circular	Proton, deuteron	75 MeV	Now used as a preaccelerator for COSY and irradiation purposes

^{[1]} The magnetic pole pieces and return yoke from the 60-inch cyclotron were later moved to UC Davis and incorporated into a 76-inch isochronous cyclotron which is still in use today

=== Other early accelerator types ===
Accelerator	Location	Years of operation	Shape and size	Accelerated particle	Kinetic Energy	Notes and discoveries made
Linear particle accelerator	Aachen University, Germany	1928	Linear Beamline	Ion	50 keV	Proof of concept
Cockcroft and Walton's electrostatic accelerator	Cavendish Laboratory	1932	See Cockroft– Walton generator	Proton	0.7 MeV	First to artificially split the nucleus (Lithium)
Betatron	Siemens-Schuckertwerke, Germany	1935	Circular	Electron	1.8 MeV	Proof of concept

=== Synchrotrons ===
Accelerator	Location	Years of operation	Shape and size	Accelerated particle	Kinetic Energy	Notes and discoveries made	INSPIRE link
Cosmotron	BNL	1953–1968	Circular ring (72 meters around)	Proton	3.3 GeV	Discovery of V particles, first artificial production of some mesons	INSPIRE
Birmingham Synchrotron	University of Birmingham	1953–1967		Proton	1 GeV		
Bevatron	Berkeley Rad Lab	1954–~1970	"Race track"	Proton	6.2 GeV	Strange particle experiments, antiproton and antineutron discovered, resonances discovered	INSPIRE
Bevalac, combination of SuperHILAC linear accelerator, a diverting tube, then the Bevatron	Berkeley Rad Lab	~1970–1993	Linear accelerator followed by "race track"	Any and all sufficiently stable nuclei could be accelerated		Observation of compressed nuclear matter. Depositing ions in tumors in cancer research.	INSPIRE
Saturne	Saclay, France	1958–1997			3 GeV		INSPIRE
Synchrophasotron	Dubna, Russia	December 1957 – 2003			10 GeV		INSPIRE
Zero Gradient Synchrotron	ANL	1963–1979			12.5 GeV		INSPIRE
U-70 Proton Synchrotron	IHEP, Russia	1967–present	Circular ring (perimeter around 1.5 km)	Proton	70 GeV		INSPIRE
Proton Synchrotron	CERN	1959–present	Circular ring (628 meters around)	Proton	26 GeV	Used to feed ISR (until 1984), SPS, LHC, AD	INSPIRE
Proton Synchrotron Booster	CERN	1972–present	Circular Synchrotron	Protons	1.4 GeV	Used to feed PS, ISOLDE	INSPIRE
Super Proton Synchrotron	CERN	1976–present	Circular Synchrotron	Protons and ions	450 GeV	COMPASS, OPERA and ICARUS at Laboratori Nazionali del Gran Sasso	INSPIRE
Alternating Gradient Synchrotron	BNL	1960–present	Circular ring (808 meters)	Proton (unpolarized and polarized), deuteron, helium-3, copper, gold, uranium	33 GeV	J/ψ, muon neutrino, CP violation in kaons, injects heavy ions and polarized protons into RHIC	INSPIRE
Proton Synchrotron (KEK)	KEK	1976–2007	Circular ring	Proton	12 GeV		
COSY	Jülich, Germany	1993–present	Circular ring (183.47 m)	Protons, Deuterons	2.88 GeV	The legacy of the experimental hadron physics programme at COSY	INSPIRE
ALBA	Cerdanyola del Vallès, Barcelona	2011–present	Circular ring (270 m)	Electrons	3 GeV		INSPIRE
Sirius	São Paulo State, Brazil	2018–present	Circular ring (518.4 m)	Electrons, Au, Sn, TiO2	3 GeV		INSPIRE
Australian Synchrotron	Monash University, Melbourne	2007–present	Circular ring (216 m)	Electrons	3 GeV		INSPIRE

== Fixed-target accelerators ==
More modern accelerators that were also run in fixed target mode; often, they will also have been run as colliders, or accelerated particles for use in subsequently built colliders.

=== LHCb gas-target collisions ===
Accelerator	Location	Years of operation	Collision systems	Beam energy
LHCb SMOG (proton mode)	CERN	2012–2026	p–H_{2}, p–D_{2}, p–He, p–Ne, p–Ar, p–Xe	0.6–6.8 TeV
LHCb SMOG (HI mode)	CERN	2012–2026	Pb–Ne, Pb–Ar, O–H_{2}, Ne–Ne	1.58–2.68 TeV per nucleon

=== High intensity hadron accelerators (Meson and neutron sources) ===
Accelerator	Location	Years of operation	Shape and size	Accelerated Particle	Kinetic Energy	Notes and discoveries made	INSPIRE link
High Current Proton Accelerator Los Alamos Neutron Science Center (originally Los Alamos Meson Physics Facility)	Los Alamos National Laboratory	1972–present	Linear (800 m) and Circular (30 m)	Protons	800 MeV	Neutron materials research, proton radiography, high energy neutron research, ultra cold neutrons	INSPIRE
PSI, HIPA High Intensity 590 MeV Proton Accelerator	PSI, Villigen, Switzerland	1974–present	0.8 MeV CW, 72 MeV Injector 2, 590 MeV Ringcyclotron	Protons	590 MeV, 2.4 mA, =1.4 MW	Highest beam power, used for meson and neutron production with applications in materials science	INSPIRE
TRIUMF Cyclotron	TRIUMF, Vancouver BC	1974–present	Circular	H-ion	500 MeV	World's largest cyclotron, at 17.9m	INSPIRE
ISIS neutron source	Rutherford Appleton Laboratory, Harwell Science and Innovation Campus, Oxfordshire, United Kingdom	1984–present	H- Linac followed by proton RCS	Protons	800 MeV		INSPIRE
Spallation Neutron Source	Oak Ridge National Laboratory	2006–present	Linear (335 m) and Circular (248 m)	Protons	800 MeV – 1 GeV	Produces the most intense pulsed neutron beams in the world for scientific research and industrial development.	INSPIRE
J-PARC RCS	Tōkai, Ibaraki	2007–present	Triangular, 348m circumference	Protons	3 GeV	Used for material and life sciences and input to J-PARC main ring	INSPIRE

=== Electron and low intensity hadron accelerators ===
Accelerator	Location	Years of operation	Shape and size	Accelerated particle	Kinetic Energy	Experiments	Notes	INSPIRE link
Antiproton Accumulator	CERN	1980–1996					Design study	INSPIRE
Antiproton collector	CERN	1986–1996		Antiprotons			Design study	INSPIRE
Nuclotron	JINR	1992–present	Circular ring	Proton and heavy ions	12.6 GeV (protons), 4.5 Gev/n (heavy ions)		INSPIRE	
Antiproton Decelerator	CERN	2000–present	Storage ring	Protons and antiprotons	26 GeV	ATHENA, ATRAP, ASACUSA, ACE, ALPHA, AEGIS	Design study	INSPIRE
Low Energy Antiproton Ring	CERN	1982–1996		Antiprotons		PS210	Design study	INSPIRE
Cambridge Electron Accelerator	Harvard University and MIT, Cambridge, MA	1962–1974	236 ft diameter synchrotron	Electrons	6 GeV			
SLAC Linac	SLAC National Accelerator Laboratory	1966–present	3 km linear accelerator	Electron/ Positron	50 GeV		Repeatedly upgraded, used to feed PEP, SPEAR, SLC, and PEP-II. Now split into 1 km sections feeding LCLS, FACET & LCLS-II.	INSPIRE
Fermilab Booster	Fermilab	1970–present	Circular synchrotron	Protons	8 GeV	MiniBooNE		INSPIRE
Fermilab Main Injector	Fermilab	1995–present	Circular synchrotron	Protons and antiprotons	150 GeV	MINOS, MINERνA, NOνA		INSPIRE
Fermilab Main Ring	Fermilab	1970–1995	Circular synchrotron	Protons and antiprotons	400 GeV (until 1979), 150 GeV thereafter			
Electron Synchrotron of Frascati	Laboratori Nazionali di Frascati	1959–? (decommissioned)	9m circular synchrotron	Electron	1.1 GeV			
Bates Linear Accelerator	Middleton, MA	1967–2005	500 MeV recirculating linac and storage ring	Polarized electrons	1 GeV			INSPIRE
Continuous Electron Beam Accelerator Facility (CEBAF)	Thomas Jefferson National Accelerator Facility, Newport News, VA	1995–present	6 GeV recirculating linac (recently upgraded to 12 GeV)	Polarized electrons	6–12 GeV	DVCS, PrimEx II, Qweak, GlueX	First large-scale deployment of superconducting RF technology.	INSPIRE
ELSA	Physikalisches Institut der Universität Bonn, Germany	1987–present	Synchrotron and stretcher	(Polarized) electrons	3.5 GeV	BGOOD, Crystal Barrel		INSPIRE
MAMI	Mainz, Germany	1975–present	Multilevel racetrack microtron	Polarized electrons	1.5 GeV accelerator	A1 – Electron Scattering, A2 – Real Photons, A4 – Parity Violation, X1 – X-Ray Radiation		INSPIRE
Tevatron	Fermilab	1983–2011	Superconducting circular synchrotron	Protons	980 GeV			INSPIRE
Universal Linear Accelerator (UNILAC)	GSI Helmholtz Centre for Heavy Ion Research, Darmstadt, Germany	1974–present	Linear (120 m)	Ions of all naturally occurring elements	2–11.4 MeV/u			INSPIRE
Schwerionensynchrotron (SIS18)	GSI Helmholtz Centre for Heavy Ion Research, Darmstadt, Germany	1990–present	Synchrotron with 271 m circumference	Ions of all naturally occurring elements	U: 50–1000 MeV/u; Ne: 50–2000 MeV/u p: 4,5 GeV			INSPIRE
Experimental Storage Ring (ESR)	GSI Helmholtz Centre for Heavy Ion Research, Darmstadt, Germany	1990–present		Ions of all naturally occurring elements	0.005 – 0.5 GeV/u			
J-PARC Main Ring	Tōkai, Ibaraki	2009–present	Triangular, 500m diameter	Protons	30 GeV	J-PARC Hadron Experimental Facility, T2K	Can also provide 8 GeV beam	INSPIRE
Low Energy Neutron Source (LENS)	Indiana University, Bloomington, Indiana (USA)	2004–present	Linear	Protons	13 MeV	SANS, SESAME, MIS	LENS Website	
Cornell BNL ERL Test Accelerator (CBETA)	Cornell University, Ithaca / NY (USA)	2019–present	Energy recovery linac with SRF cavities, 4 turns, and all beams in one fixed field alternating-gradient lattice of permanent magnets	Electrons	150 MeV	A prototype facility for Electron Ion Colliders		INSPIRE

== Colliders ==
=== Electron–positron colliders ===
Accelerator	Location	Years of operation	Shape and circumference	Electron energy	Positron energy	Experiments	Notable Discoveries	INSPIRE link
AdA	LNF, Frascati, Italy; Orsay, France	1961–1964	Circular, 3 meters	250 MeV	250 MeV		Touschek effect (1963); first e^{+}e^{−} interactions recorded (1964)	INSPIRE
Princeton-Stanford (e^{−}e^{−})	Stanford, California	1962–1967	Two-ring, 12 m	300 MeV	300 MeV		e^{−}e^{−} interactions	
VEP-1 (e^{−}e^{−})	INP, Novosibirsk, Soviet Union	1964–1968	Two-ring, 2.70 m	130 MeV	130 MeV		e^{−}e^{−} scattering; QED radiative effects confirmed	INSPIRE
VEPP-2	INP, Novosibirsk, Soviet Union	1965–1974	Circular, 11.5 m	700 MeV	700 MeV	OLYA, CMD	multihadron production (1966), e^{+}e^{−}→φ (1966), e^{+}e^{−}→γγ (1971)	INSPIRE
ACO	LAL, Orsay, France	1965–1975	Circular, 22 m	550 MeV	550 MeV	ρ_{0}, K^{+}K^{−},φ_{3C}, μ^{+}μ^{−}, M2N and DM1	Vector meson studies; then ACO was used as synchrotron light source until 1988	INSPIRE
SPEAR	SLAC	1972–1990(?)	Circular	3 GeV	3 GeV	Mark I, Mark II, Mark III	Discovery of Charmonium states and Tau lepton	INSPIRE
VEPP-2M	BINP, Novosibirsk	1974–2000	Circular, 17.88 m	700 MeV	700 MeV	ND, SND, CMD-2	e^{+}e^{−} cross sections, radiative decays of ρ, ω, and φ mesons	INSPIRE
DORIS	DESY	1974–1993	Circular, 300m	5 GeV	5 GeV	ARGUS, Crystal Ball, DASP, PLUTO	Oscillation in neutral B mesons	INSPIRE
PETRA	DESY	1978–1986	Circular, 2 km	20 GeV	20 GeV	JADE, MARK-J, CELLO, PLUTO, TASSO	Discovery of the gluon in three jet events	INSPIRE
CESR	Cornell University	1979–2002	Circular, 768m	6 GeV	6 GeV	CUSB, CHESS, CLEO, CLEO-2, CLEO-2.5, CLEO-3	First observation of B decay, charmless and "radiative penguin" B decays	INSPIRE
PEP	SLAC	1980–1990(?)				Mark II		INSPIRE
SLC	SLAC	1988–1998(?)	Addition to SLAC Linac	45 GeV	45 GeV	SLD, Mark II	First linear collider	INSPIRE
LEP	CERN	1989–2000	Circular, 27 km	104 GeV	104 GeV	Aleph, Delphi, Opal, L3	Only 3 light (m ≤ m_{Z}/2) weakly interacting neutrinos exist, implying only three generations of quarks and leptons	INSPIRE
BEPC	Beijing, China	1989–2004	Circular, 240m	2.2 GeV	2.2 GeV	Beijing Spectrometer (I and II)		INSPIRE
VEPP-4M	BINP, Novosibirsk	1994–	Circular, 366m	6.0 GeV	6.0 GeV	KEDR	Precise measurement of psi-meson masses, two-photon physics	
PEP-II	SLAC	1998–2008	Circular, 2.2 km	9 GeV	3.1 GeV	BaBar	Discovery of CP violation in B meson system	INSPIRE
KEKB	KEK	1999–2009	Circular, 3 km	8.0 GeV	3.5 GeV	Belle	Discovery of CP violation in B meson system	
DAΦNE	LNF, Frascati, Italy	1999–2020	Circular, 98m	0.7 GeV	0.7 GeV	KLOE	Crab-waist collisions (2007)	INSPIRE
CESR-c	Cornell University	2002–2008	Circular, 768m	6 GeV	6 GeV	CHESS, CLEO-c		INSPIRE
VEPP-2000	BINP, Novosibirsk	2006–	Circular, 24.4m	1.0 GeV	1.0 GeV	SND, CMD-3	Round beams (2007)	
BEPC II	Beijing, China	2008–	Circular, 240m	1.89 GeV	1.89 GeV	Beijing Spectrometer III		
VEPP-5	BINP, Novosibirsk	2015–						
ADONE	LNF, Frascati, Italy	1969–1993	Circular, 105m	1.5 GeV	1.5 GeV			
TRISTAN	KEK	1987–1995	Circular, 3016m	30 GeV	30 GeV			
SuperKEKB	KEK	2016–	Circular, 3 km	7.0 GeV	4.0 GeV	Belle II		

=== Hadron colliders ===
Accelerator	Location	Years of operation	Shape and size	Particles collided	Beam energy	Experiments	INSPIRE
Intersecting; Storage Rings	CERN	1971–1984	Circular rings (948 m around)	Proton/ Proton	31.5 GeV		INSPIRE
Super; Proton Synchrotron/Spp̅S	CERN	1981–1984	Circular ring (6.9 km around)	Proton/ Antiproton	270–315 GeV	UA1, UA2	INSPIRE
Tevatron; Run I	Fermilab	1992–1995	Circular ring (6.3 km around)	Proton/ Antiproton	900 GeV	CDF, D0	INSPIRE
Tevatron; Run II	Fermilab	2001–2011	Circular ring (6.3 km around)	Proton/ Antiproton	980 GeV	CDF, D0	INSPIRE
Relativistic Heavy Ion Collider (RHIC) polarized proton mode	Brookhaven National Laboratory, New York	2001–2026	Hexagonal rings (3.8 km circumference)	Polarized Proton/ Proton	100–255 GeV	PHENIX, STAR	INSPIRE
Relativistic Heavy Ion Collider (RHIC) ion mode	Brookhaven National Laboratory, New York	2000–2026	Hexagonal rings (3.8 km circumference)	d-^{197}Au^{79+};^{63}Cu^{29+}–^{63}Cu^{29+};^{63}Cu^{29+}–^{197}Au^{79+};^{197}Au^{79+}–^{197}Au^{79+};^{238}U^{92+}–^{238}U^{92+}	3.85–100 GeV per nucleon	STAR, PHENIX, BRAHMS, PHOBOS	INSPIRE
Large Hadron Collider (LHC) proton mode	CERN	2008–2026	Circular rings (27 km circumference)	Proton/ Proton	6.8 TeV (0.45/0.6/3.5/4/6.5/6.8) TeV	ALICE, ATLAS, CMS, LHCb, LHCf, TOTEM, MoEDAL, FASER, SND@LHC	INSPIRE
Large Hadron Collider (LHC) ion mode	CERN	2010–2026	Circular rings (27 km circumference)	^{208}Pb^{82+}–^{208}Pb^{82+}; Proton–^{208}Pb^{82+};^{129}Xe^{54+}–^{129}Xe^{54+}; Proton–^{16}O^{8+};^{16}O^{8+}–^{16}O^{8+};^{20}Ne^{10+}–^{20}Ne^{10+}	In Pb–Pb: 1.58–2.68 TeV per nucleon	ALICE, ATLAS, CMS, LHCb, MoEDAL, FASER, SND@LHC	INSPIRE
High-Luminosity Large Hadron Collider (HL-LHC) proton mode	CERN	2030–2041 (planned)	Circular rings (27 km circumference)	Proton/ Proton	6.8 TeV	ALICE, ATLAS, CMS, LHCb, LHCf, TOTEM, MAPP	INSPIRE
High-Luminosity Large Hadron Collider (HL-LHC) ion mode	CERN	2031–2041 (planned)	Circular rings (27 km circumference)	^{208}Pb^{82+}–^{208}Pb^{82+}; Proton-^{208}Pb^{82+}	2.76 TeV per nucleon	ALICE, ATLAS, CMS, LHCb, MAPP	INSPIRE

=== Electron–proton colliders ===
Accelerator	Location	Years of operation	Shape and size	Electron energy	Proton energy	Experiments	INSPIRE link
HERA	DESY	1992–2007	Circular ring (6336 meters around)	27.5 GeV	920 GeV	H1, ZEUS, HERMES experiment, HERA-B	INSPIRE
Electron–Ion Collider (EIC)	Brookhaven National Laboratory, New York	Mid-2030s (planned)	Circular rings	5–18 GeV	41–275 GeV	ePIC	

== Hypothetical accelerators ==
Besides the real accelerators listed above, there are hypothetical accelerators often used as hypothetical examples or optimistic projects by particle physicists.

- Eloisatron (Eurasiatic Long Intersecting Storage Accelerator) was a project of INFN headed by Antonio Zichichi at the Ettore Majorana Foundation and Centre for Scientific Culture in Erice, Sicily. The center-of-mass energy was planned to be 200 TeV, and the size was planned to span parts of Europe and Asia.
- Fermitron was an accelerator sketched by Enrico Fermi on a notepad in the 1940s proposing an accelerator in stable orbit around the Earth.
- The undulator radiation collider is a design for an accelerator with a center-of-mass energy around the GUT scale. It would be light-weeks across and require the construction of a Dyson swarm around the Sun.
- Planckatron is an accelerator with a center-of-mass energy of the order of the Planck scale. It is estimated that the radius of the Planckatron would have to be roughly the radius of the Milky Way. It would require so much energy to run that it could only be built by at least a Kardashev Type II civilization.
- Arguably also in this category falls the Zevatron, a hypothetical source for observed ultra-high-energy cosmic rays.

== See also ==
- List of accelerator mass spectrometry facilities
- List of synchrotron radiation facilities
