= Giuseppe Cocconi =

Italian physicist

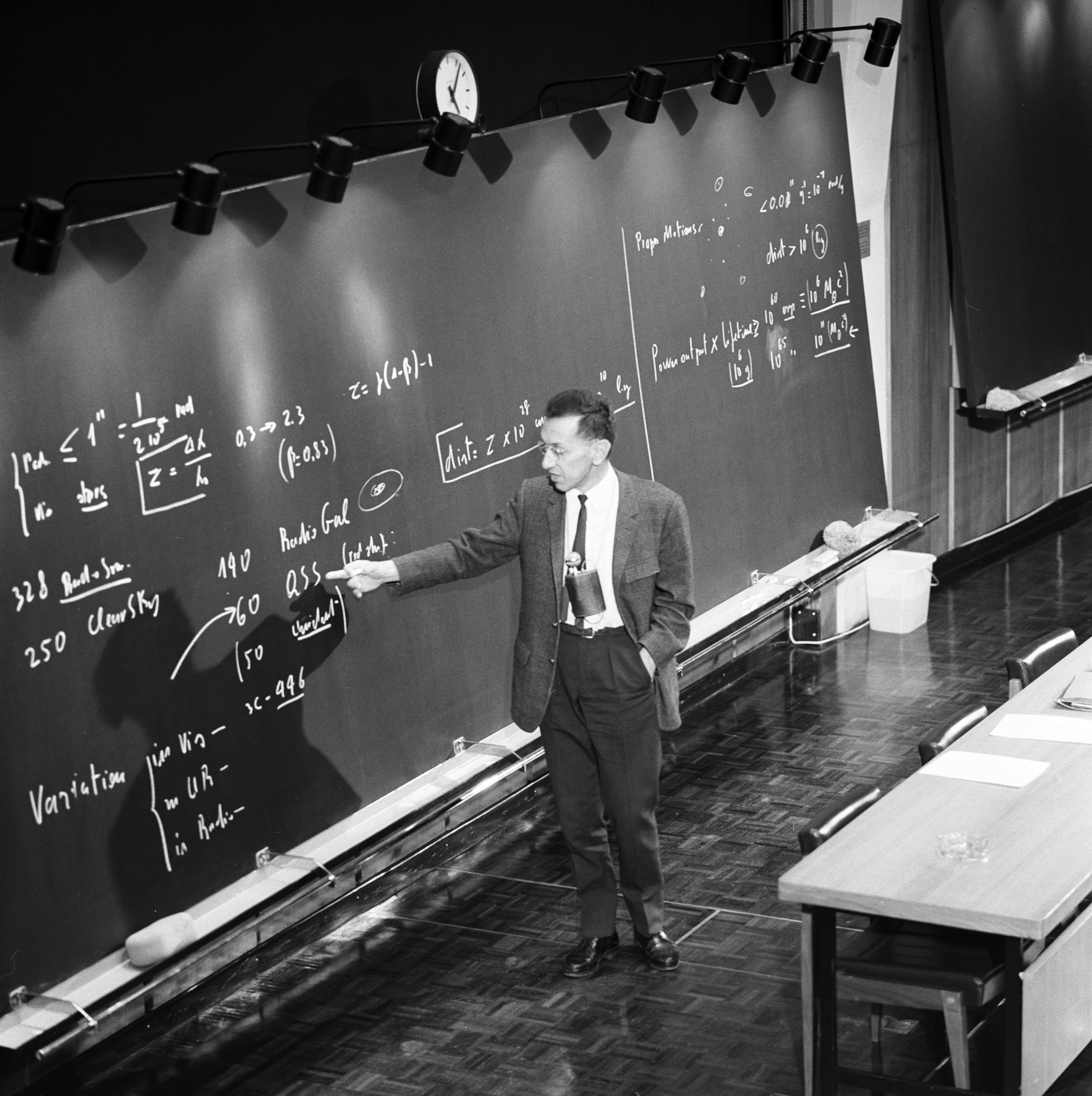
- Cocconi giving a lecture in CERN's main auditorium in 1967
- Born: 1914; Como, Kingdom of Italy
- Died: 9 November 2008 (aged 93–94); Geneva, Switzerland
- Citizenship: Italian
- Education: University of Milan
- Known for: Pomeron, Roman pot, CHARM, CERN director
- Awards: Guggenheim Fellowship
- Scientific career
- Fields: Particle and high-energy physics, Cosmic ray research
- Workplaces: University of Catania; Cornell University; Sapienza University of Rome; CERN: Proton Synchrotron; Brookhaven National Laboratory

Giuseppe Cocconi (1914–2008) was an Italian physicist who was director of the Proton Synchrotron at CERN in Geneva. He is known for his work in particle physics and for his involvement with SETI where he wrote, "[t]he probability of success is difficult to estimate; but if we never search, the chance of success is zero."

== Life ==
Cocconi was born in Como, Kingdom of Italy in 1914. He went to study physics at the University of Milan, and then in February 1938, went to the Sapienza University of Rome on the invitation of Edoardo Amaldi. There he met physicists Enrico Fermi and Gilberto Bernardini. With Fermi, he built a Wilson chamber to study the disintegration of mesons. In August of that year, Cocconi laid the foundation of cosmic ray research in Milan. While at Milan, Cocconi supervised Vanna Tongiorgi, who picked cosmic rays as her thesis' subject, and later married her in 1945.

In 1942, Cocconi was nominated professor at University of Catania, but was engaged by the Italian army to research infrared phenomena for the Royal Italian Air Force until the end of World War II, in late 1944. He taught at Catania until 1947, when Hans Bethe made a request that he would join Cornell University. During his stay at Cornell, Cocconi and his wife performed many experiments there and in Echo Lake located in the Rocky Mountains, where they demonstrated the galactic and extragalactic origins of cosmic rays. In 1955, he was awarded a Guggenheim Fellowship. While at Cornell he also wrote, with Philip Morrison, his most famous paper "Searching for Interstellar Communications", on the 21 cm Hydrogen line, which turned out to be of vital importance in the SETI program.

During his sabbatical of 1959–1961, Cocconi helped kick-start the Proton Synchrotron research program at CERN, and conducted a series of experiment on proton-proton scattering, and on the cross section of protons and neutrons. He also continued this research at Brookhaven National Laboratory (BNL). In 1963 he returned at CERN, and discovered with Alan Wetherell, Bert Diddens, and others, that the diffraction peak in proton-proton scattering shrunk with the increase in collision energy. This was interpreted as the "exchange of two Regge Poles", which later became known as the pomeron.

From 1967 to 1969, Cocconi was CERN's research director, and conceived the Roman pot, a type of particle detector. Then with a group led by Klaus Winter, he formed the CHARM collaboration, which worked until the 1980s, which investigated elastic electron-neutrino scattering. He retired in 1979, but kept in touch with the CERN research, and particle physics related research in general.

Cocconi died on 9 November 2008. His colleagues and friends wrote the following in his CERN's obituary:

Giuseppe enjoyed the respect of great physicists in the world. As a man of culture and vision, he was very curious and attentive to what was going on in the world, and not only in the field of physics. Very kind and always ready to listen, straightforward but humble in his relations with his colleagues, always ready to admire other people’s success, he was happy to share his knowledge with juniors. His refusal of association with academies, and his lack of interest in prizes and honours, as well as his wish not to talk publicly, after his retirement, of his scientific life, are well known. He was a great physicist.
