= TOTEM experiment =

One of nine detector experiments at CERN

Coordinates: 46°18′35″N 6°04′35″E

Large Hadron Collider (LHC)
- Plan of the LHC experiments and the preaccelerators.

LHC experiments
- ATLAS: A Toroidal LHC Apparatus
- CMS: Compact Muon Solenoid
- LHCb: LHC-beauty
- ALICE: A Large Ion Collider Experiment
- TOTEM: Total Cross Section, Elastic Scattering and Diffraction Dissociation
- LHCf: LHC-forward
- MoEDAL: Monopole and Exotics Detector At the LHC
- FASER: ForwArd Search ExpeRiment
- SND: Scattering and Neutrino Detector

LHC preaccelerators
- p and Pb: Linear accelerators for protons (Linac 4) and lead (Linac 3)
- (not marked): Proton Synchrotron Booster
- PS: Proton Synchrotron
- SPS: Super Proton Synchrotron

The TOTEM experiment (TOTal Elastic and diffractive cross section Measurement) is one of the nine detector experiments at CERN's Large Hadron Collider. The other eight are: ATLAS, ALICE, CMS, LHCb, LHCf, MoEDAL, FASER and SND@LHC. It shares an interaction point with CMS. The detector aims at measurement of total cross section, elastic scattering, and diffraction processes. The primary instrument of the detector is referred to as a Roman pot. In December 2020, the D0 and TOTEM Collaborations made public the odderon discovery based on a purely data driven approach in a CERN and Fermilab approved preprint that was later published in Physical Review Letters. In this experimental observation, the TOTEM proton-proton data in the region of the diffractive minimum and maximum was extrapolated from 13, 8, 7 and 2.76 TeV to 1.96 TeV and compared this to D0 data at 1.96 TeV in the same t-range giving an odderon significance of 3.4 σ. When combined with TOTEM experimental data at 13 TeV at small scattering angles providing an odderon significance of 3.4 - 4.6 σ, the combination resulted in an odderon significance of at least 5.2 σ.

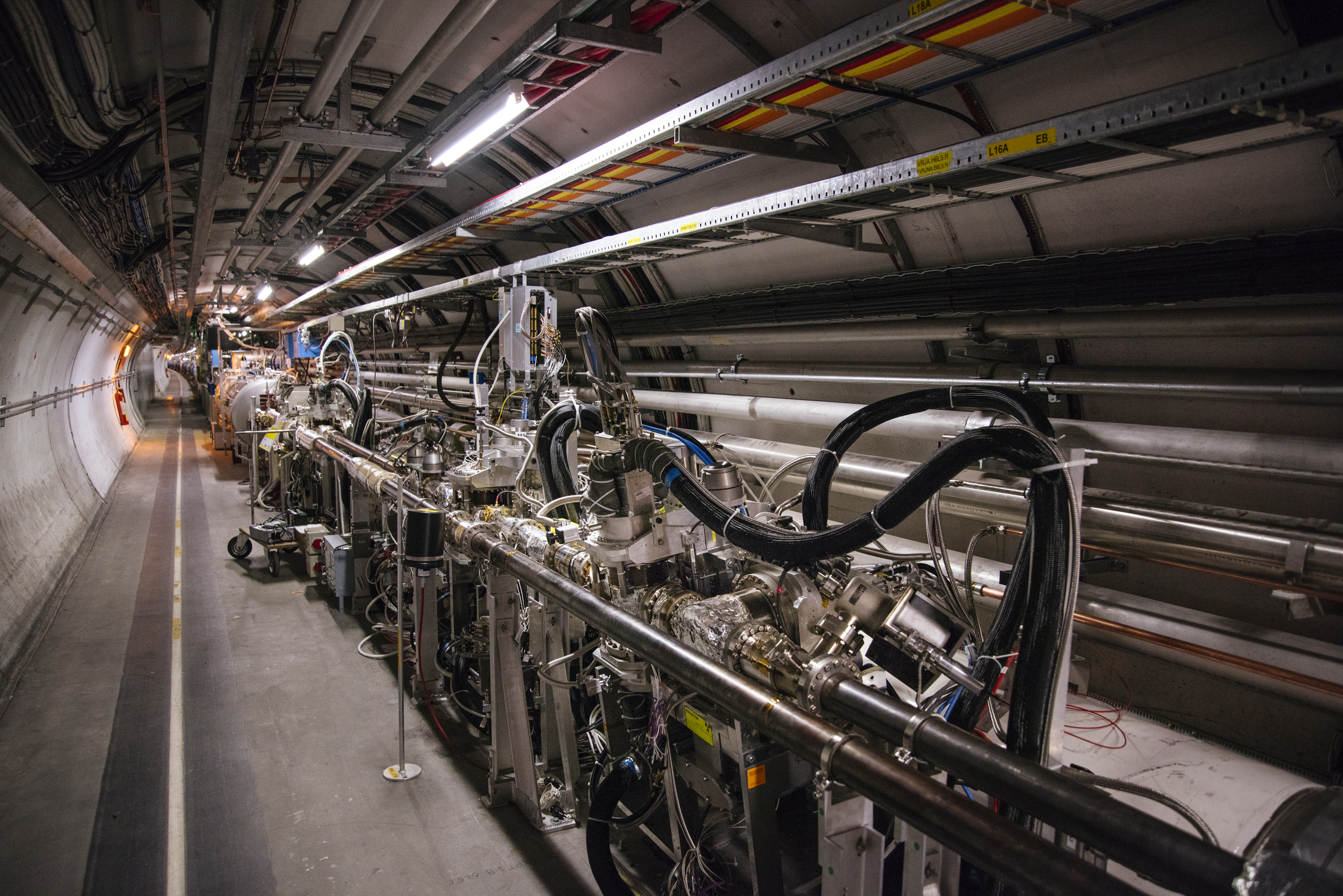
TOTEM experiment in the LHC tunnel

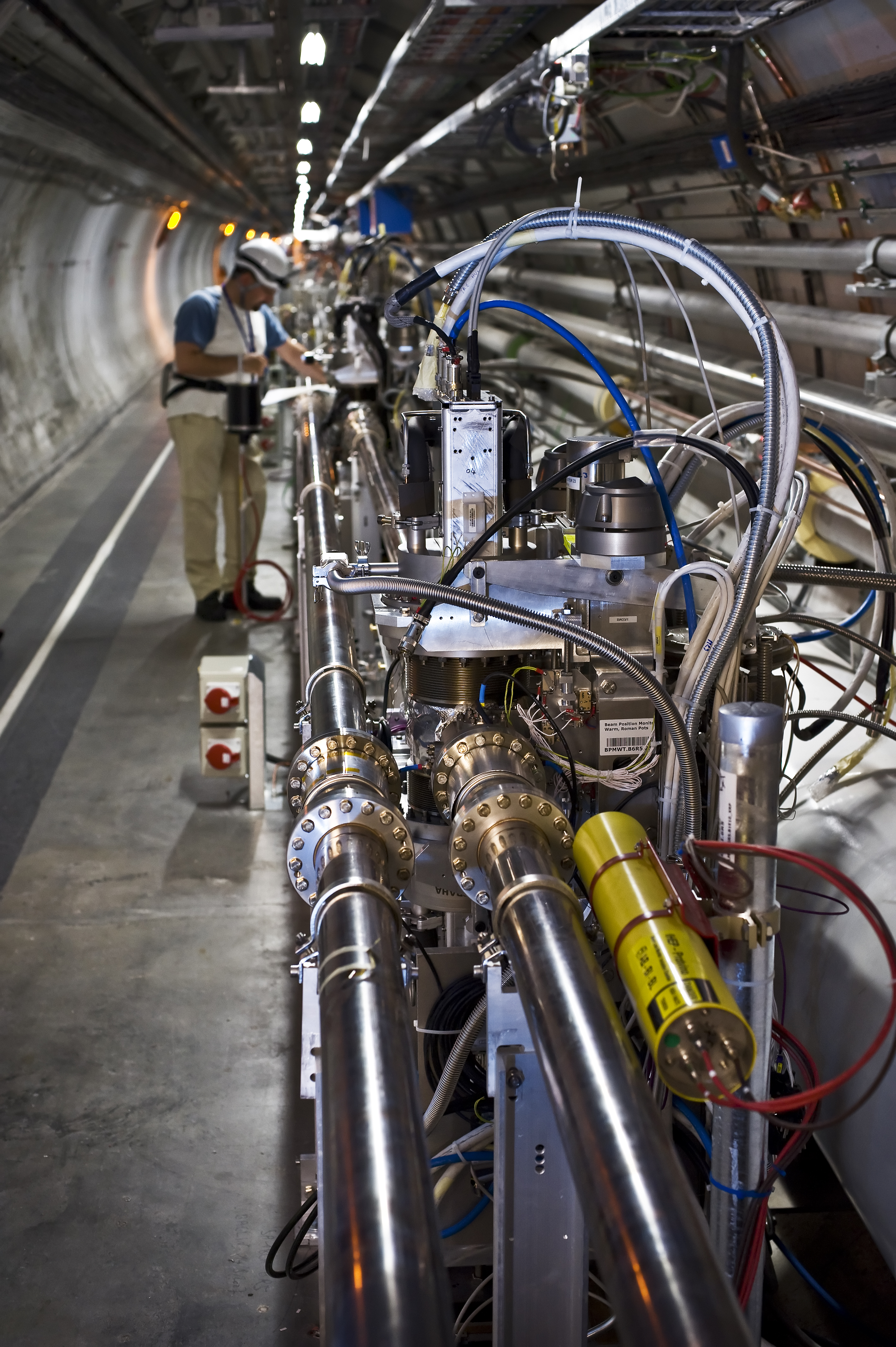
The roman pot of TOTEM experiment.

== See also ==
- CERN: European Organization for Nuclear Research
- Large Hadron Collider
