= ALICE experiment =

Detector experiment at CERN

Coordinates: 46°15′04.8″N 6°01′12.5″E

ALICE
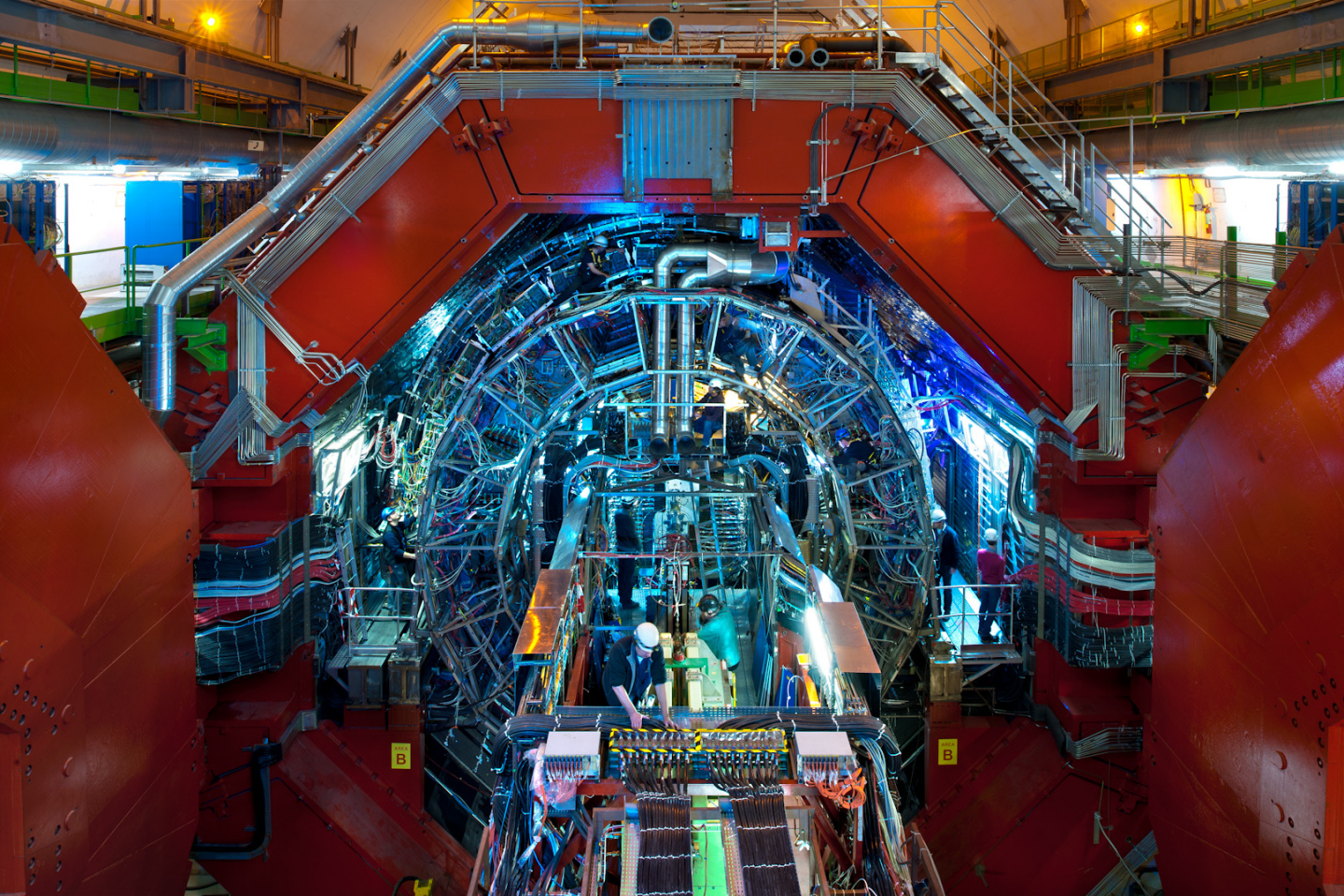
- Front view of ALICE with magnet doors opened
- Formation: Letter of Intent submitted in July 1993
- Headquarters: Geneva, Switzerland
- List of ALICE Spokespersons: Kai Oliver Schweda; Marco van Leeuwen; Luciano Musa; Federico Antinori; Paolo Giubellino; Jurgen Schukraft
- Website: https://alice.cern/

Large Hadron Collider (LHC)
- Plan of the LHC experiments and the preaccelerators

LHC experiments
- ATLAS: A Toroidal LHC Apparatus
- CMS: Compact Muon Solenoid
- LHCb: LHC-beauty
- ALICE: A Large Ion Collider Experiment
- TOTEM: Total Cross Section, Elastic Scattering and Diffraction Dissociation
- LHCf: LHC-forward
- MoEDAL: Monopole and Exotics Detector At the LHC
- FASER: ForwArd Search ExpeRiment
- SND: Scattering and Neutrino Detector

LHC preaccelerators
- p and Pb: Linear accelerators for protons (Linac 4) and lead (Linac 3)
- (not marked): Proton Synchrotron Booster
- PS: Proton Synchrotron
- SPS: Super Proton Synchrotron

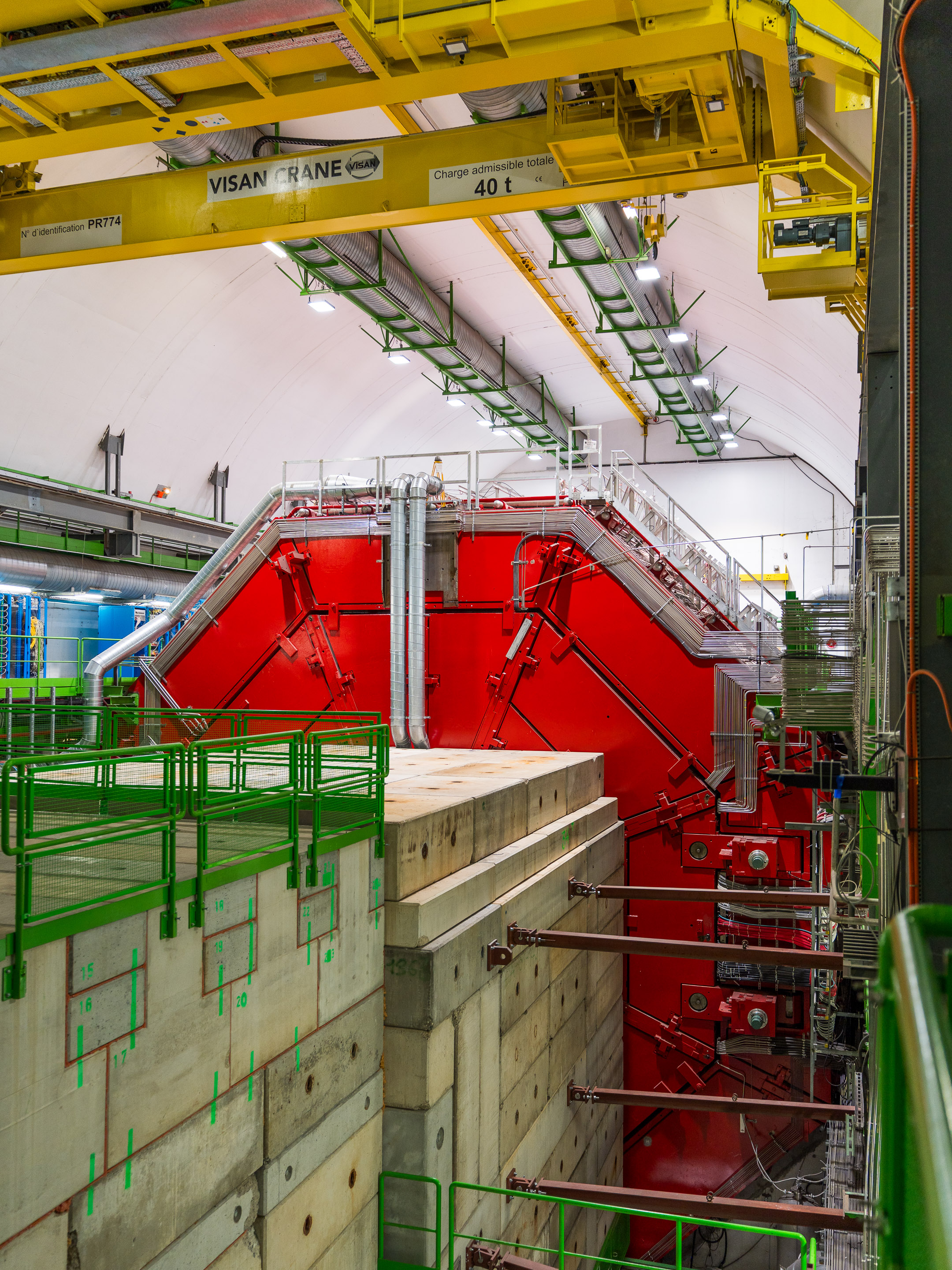
ALICE experiment cavern in data-acquisition configuration (magnet doors closed) viewed from the front (A side)

A Large Ion Collider Experiment (ALICE) is one of the nine detector experiments at the Large Hadron Collider (LHC). It is designed to study the conditions thought to have existed immediately after the Big Bang, which it does by measuring the properties of quark–gluon plasma.

== Introduction ==
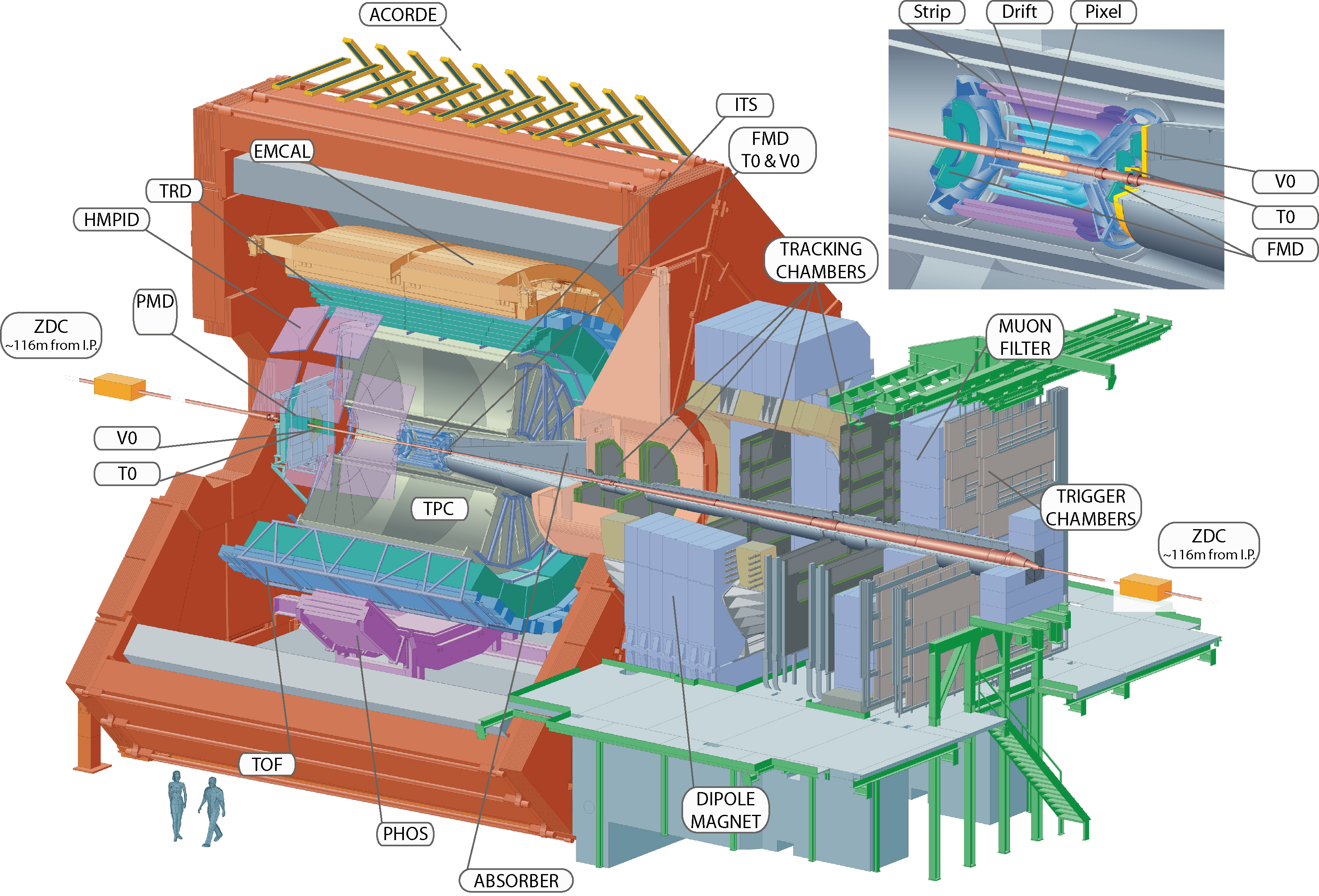
Computer generated cut-away view of ALICE showing its 18 components that were used in LHC runs 1 & 2 (until 2018).

ALICE is designed to study high-energy collisions between lead nuclei. These collisions mimic the extreme temperature and energy density that would have been found in the fractions of a second after the Big Bang. This is because they form a quark–gluon plasma, a state of matter in which quarks and gluons are unbound.

The results obtained by ALICE support the understanding of complex phenomena such as color confinement, chiral symmetry restoration, and how elementary particles interact. These results guide research in quantum chromodynamics (QCD), the study of the strong force. Recreating the quark–gluon plasma and understanding its evolution are expected to shed light on how matter is organized, the mechanisms that confine quarks and gluons, and the nature of the strong force and the role it plays in generating most of the mass of ordinary matter.

QCD predicts that at sufficiently high energy densities, a phase transition will occur within conventional hadronic matter, where quarks, which are confined within nuclear particles, transition into a quark–gluon plasma where they are not. The reverse of this transition is believed to have occurred when the universe was approximately one microsecond (10^{−6} seconds) old, and transitions like it may still occur in the centers of collapsing neutron stars and other astrophysical objects.

== History ==
The idea of building a dedicated heavy-ion detector for the LHC was first discussed at the meeting "Towards the LHC experimental Programme", which was hosted in Évian, France, in March 1992. This meeting led to the creation of ALICE, along with other LHC programs such as ATLAS and CMS. After the Évian meeting, the ALICE collaboration was formed, and it submitted a Letter of Intent in 1993.

ALICE was first proposed as a central detector in 1993. This was later complemented by an additional forward muon spectrometer designed in 1995. In 1997, the LHC Committee allowed ALICE to proceed towards final design and construction.

The first 10 years of development were spent on an extensive research and development (R&D) effort. As with other LHC experiments, the challenges of heavy-ion physics at the LHC required advances in existing technology.

The detector was designed to be capable of measuring a wide range of signals, with flexibility for additions and modifications as new research avenues and possibilities emerged. Various major detection systems have been added over the years, including the muon spectrometer in 1995, the transition radiation detectors in 1999, and a large jet calorimeter in 2007.

In 2010, ALICE recorded data from the first lead–lead collisions at the LHC. Data sets taken during heavy-ion periods in 2010 and 2011, along with proton–lead data from 2013, provided insight into the physics of quark–gluon plasma.

In 2014, the ALICE detector underwent a major consolidation program and upgrade during the long shutdown of CERN's accelerator complex. A new sub-detector, the dijet calorimeter (DCAL), was installed. All 18 of the existing sub-detectors were upgraded, and the infrastructure, including the electrical and cooling systems, underwent major renovations.

In 2021, ALICE received additional sub-detectors, including a new inner tracking system, muon forward tracker, and fast interaction trigger.

As of 2024, the ALICE Collaboration has more than 1,900 members from 174 institutes in 39 countries. The present detector weighs about 10,000 tons and is 26 m long, 16 m high, and 16 m wide.

== Heavy-ion collisions at the LHC ==
Attempts to produce quark–gluon plasma and thereby gain a deeper understanding of QCD started at CERN and Brookhaven with collisions of lighter ions in the 1980s. Present-day programs at these laboratories have moved on to ultra-relativistic collisions of heavy ions, and are only just reaching the energy threshold at which the phase transition is expected to occur.

During head-on collisions of lead ions at the LHC, lead nuclei are accelerated to more than 99.9999991% of the speed of light. The particles collide at an energy of 5.36 TeV per nucleon pair, giving each lead ion an energy of 557.44 TeV. Two lead ions are accelerated in opposite directions, giving the final collision an energy of 1140 TeV. The collision heats matter in the interaction point to a temperature approximately 100,000 times higher than temperatures found in stellar cores.

When the two lead nuclei collide, matter undergoes a transition to briefly form a droplet of quark–gluon plasma (QGP), the material which is believed to have filled the universe a few microseconds after the Big Bang. This quark–gluon plasma is formed as protons and neutrons "melt" into their elementary constituents. The quarks and gluons they are composed of become asymptotically free. The droplet of QGP then near-instantly cools, and the individual quarks and gluons (collectively called partons) recombine into a mixture of relatively ordinary matter that speeds away in all directions. The debris contains a great variety of particles, including mesons such as pions and kaons; baryons such as protons and neutrons; and leptons such as electrons, muons, and neutrinos. The antiparticles of these particles are also produced, possibly combining to form the nuclei of antiatoms of hydrogen or helium. The properties of QGP can be inferred by studying the distribution and energy of the collision debris.

=== First lead–lead collisions ===
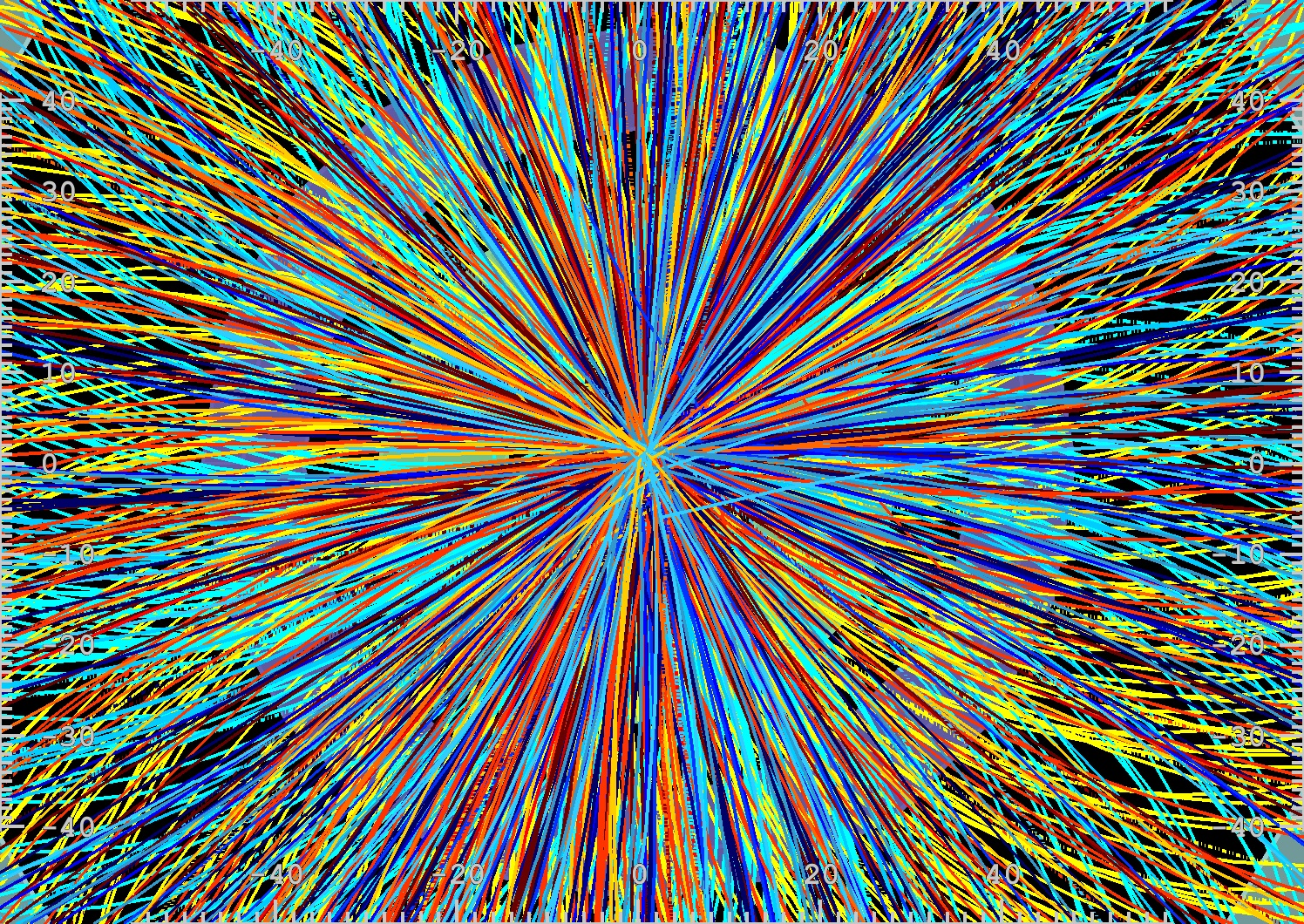
Reconstruction in the plane orthogonal to the lead-ion trajectory of one of the LHC's first lead-ion collisions recorded by the ALICE detector.

The LHC operations team at CERN first recorded collisions of lead ions on 7 November 2010 at 00:30 CET.

The first lead ion collisions detected in the center of the ALICE, ATLAS, and CMS detectors took place less than 72 hours after the LHC ended its first run of protons and switched to accelerating lead-ion beams. Each lead nucleus contains 82 protons, and the LHC accelerates the nucleus with an energy of 3.5 TeV per proton, thus resulting in an energy of 287 TeV per beam or a total collision energy of 574 TeV.

Up to 3,000 charged particles are emitted from each collision, shown in diagrams as lines radiating from the collision point. The colors of the lines indicate how much energy each particle carried away from the collision.

=== Proton–lead collisions at the LHC ===
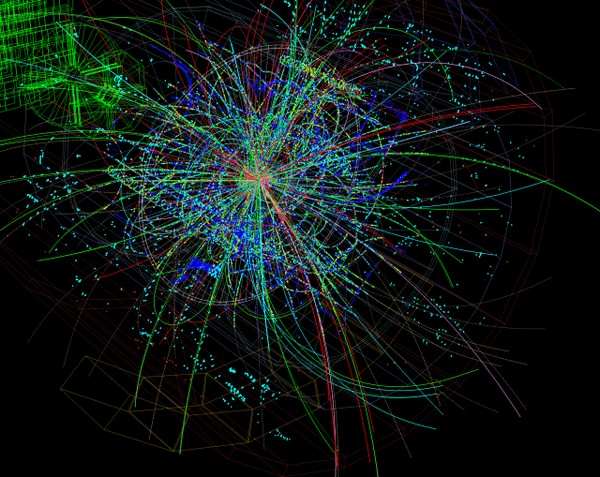
Proton-Lead ion collision event reconstruction by the ALICE Experiment on 13 September 2012 at a center of mass energy per colliding nucleon-nucleon pair of 5.02 TeV.

In 2013, the LHC collided protons with lead ions as part of the ALICE experiment. The experiment was conducted by accelerating beams of protons and lead ions in opposite directions, before colliding them when the beams reached the LHC's maximum energy. Since lead ions are heavier than protons, they entered the accelerator with different velocities, and were brought up to speed independently before colliding. This was the first successful collision of lead ions with protons.

Lead–proton experiments at the LHC lasted for one month, and data helped ALICE physicists to differentiate the effects of the quark-gluon plasma from effects that stem from cold nuclear matter effects. Lead-lead collisions form a quark-gluon plasma, while lead-proton collisions do not. By studying the effects of lead-proton collisions, physicists are able to tell what effects come from the quark-gluon plasma formed by lead-lead collisions, and what effects come from the collisions themselves, allowing for more accurate study of the quark-gluon plasma.

== The ALICE detectors ==
One of the major design goals of the ALICE experiment is to study quantum chromodynamics and quark (de)confinement under the extreme conditions of quark-gluon plasma. This is done by using particles that are created in the 'hot volume' as it expands and survive long enough to reach the detector layers around the interaction region. The ALICE experiment then has to identify the particles, through a variety of methods.

In a "traditional" experiment, particles are identified or at least assigned to families (charged vs. neutral hadrons) by the characteristic signatures they leave in the detector. The experiment is divided into a few main components, and each component tests a specific set of particle properties. These components are stacked concentrically and the particles go through the layers sequentially from the collision point outwards: first a tracking system, then an electromagnetic calorimeter and a hadronic calorimeter and finally a muon system. The detectors are embedded in a magnetic field in order to bend the tracks of charged particles. This allows for momentum and charge determination. This method for particle identification works well only for certain particles, and is used (for example) by the large LHC experiments ATLAS and CMS. However, this technique is not suitable for hadron identification as it does not allow distinguishing the different charged hadrons that are produced in Pb–Pb collisions.

In order to identify all the particles that are coming out of the quark-gluon plasma ALICE uses a set of 18 detectors that give information about the mass, velocity, and electrical sign of the particles.

=== Barrel tracking ===
An ensemble of cylindrical barrel detectors surrounding the nominal interaction point is used to track all the particles that fly out of the hot, dense medium. The Inner Tracking System (ITS), Time Projection Chamber (TPC), and Transition Radiation Detector (TRD) measure at many points the passage of each charged particle and give precise information about the particle's trajectory. The ALICE barrel tracking detectors are embedded in a magnetic field of 0.5 T bending the trajectories of the particles. This field is produced by a magnetic solenoid. From the curvature of the tracks their momentum can be derived. The ITS allows identification of particles which are generated by the decay of other particles with a long life time (those able to travel ~.1 mm before decay). This is possible because it can see that they do not originate from the point where the interaction has taken place (the "vertex" of the event), but rather from a point at a distance of as small as a tenth of a millimeter. This makes it possible to measure, for example, bottom quarks, which decay into a relatively long-lived B-meson through topological cuts.

==== Inner Tracking System ====
The short-lived heavy particles cover a very small distance before decaying. The Inner Tracking System aims at identifying these decays by measuring the location where they occur with a precision of a tenth of millimetre.

===== ITS1 (Runs 1 & 2, 2013-2018) =====
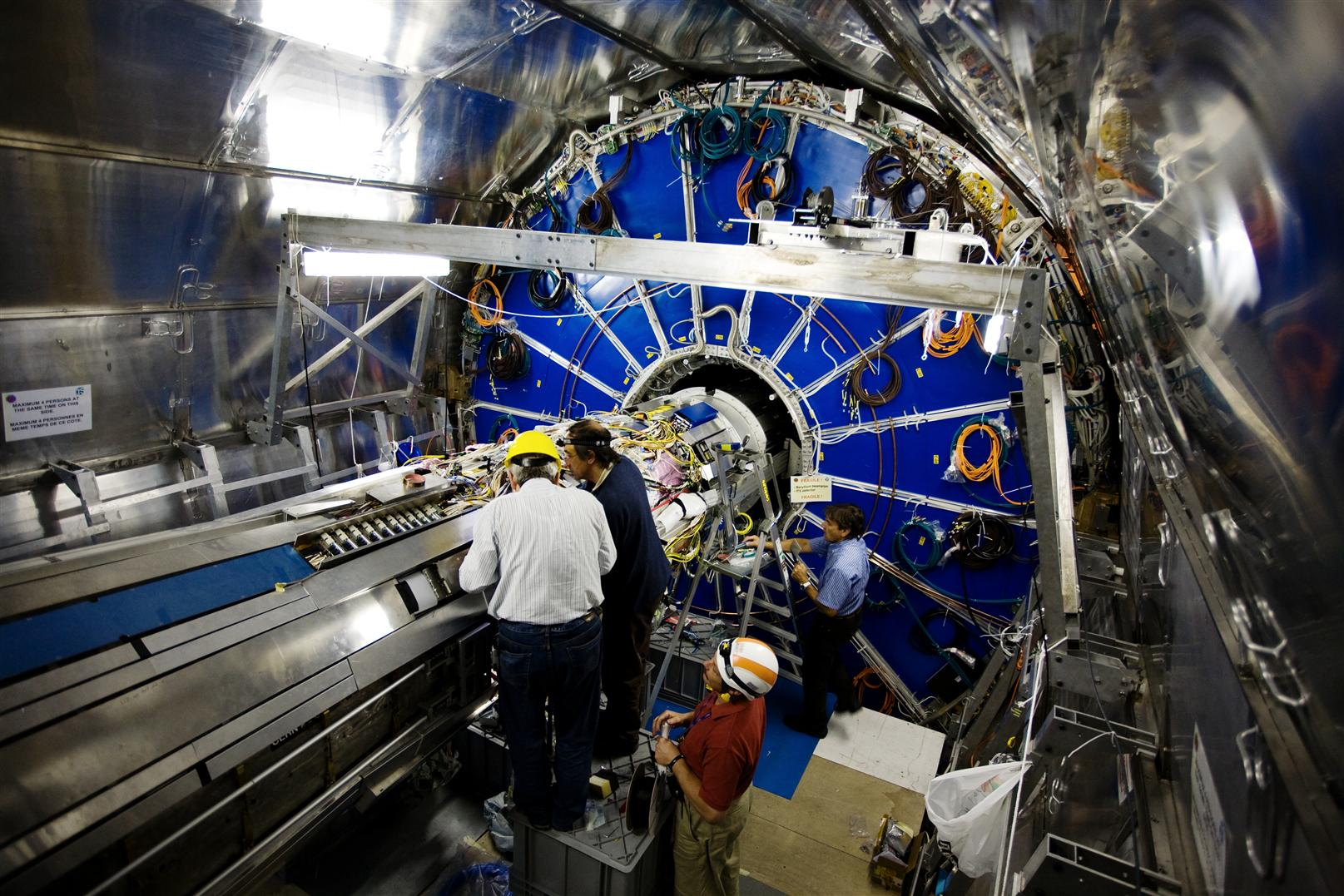
Installation of the ALICE Inner Tracking System 1 in 2007.

The first Inner Tracking System (ITS1) consisted of six cylindrical layers of silicon detectors. The layers surrounded the collision point and measured the properties of the particles emerging from the collisions, pin-pointing their position of passage to a fraction of a millimetre. With the help of the ITS, particles containing heavy charm and bottom quarks can be identified by reconstructing the coordinates at which they decay.

The ITS1 consisted of six layers, listed here outward from the interaction point:

- 2 layers of Silicon Pixel Detector,
- 2 layers of Silicon Drift Detector,
- 2 layers of Silicon Strip Detector.

The ITS1 was inserted at the heart of the center experiment in March 2007 following a large phase of R&D. With almost 5 m^{2} of double-sided silicon strip detectors and more than 1 m^{2} of silicon drift detectors, it was the largest system using both types of silicon detector.

===== ITS2 (Run 3, 2021–present) =====
ITS1 was replaced during the LHC's Long Shutdown 2 (2018–2021) by a new 7 layer monolithic active pixel sensor-based detector with the aim of improving several parameters: the determination of the impact parameter to the primary vertex, tracking efficiency at low transverse momentum, and readout rate capabilities.

The upgraded ITS was expected to allow the study of the thermalization of heavy quarks in the medium by measuring heavy charm and beauty flavored baryons and allowing these measurements to be made with very low transverse momentum for the first time. It was also expected to give a better understanding of the dependence of energy loss in the medium on quark mass, and to offer a unique capability of measuring the beauty quarks while also improving the reconstruction of the beauty decay vertex. Finally, the upgraded ITS was expected to allow for the characterization of the thermal radiation coming from the quark–gluon plasma and the in-medium modification of hadronic spectral functions as related to chiral symmetry restoration.

==== Time Projection Chamber ====
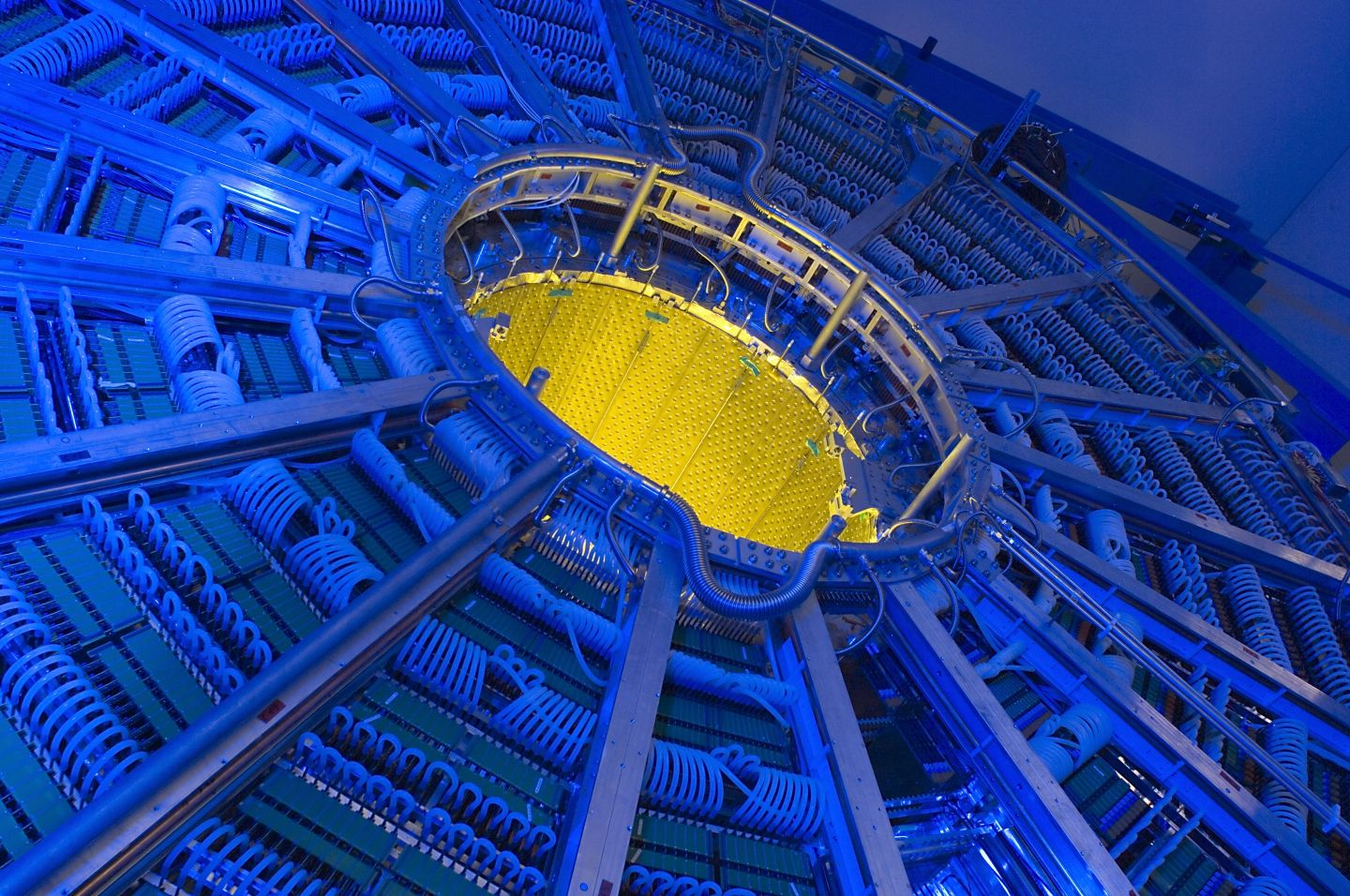
The ALICE Time Projection Chamber used for particle tracking and identification.

The ALICE Time Projection Chamber (TPC) is a large space filled with gas as a detection medium and is the main particle tracking device in ALICE.

The manner in which fast charged particles ionize the matter they pass through can be used to identify them. Charged particles crossing the gas of the TPC ionize the gas atoms along their path, freeing electrons, which drift towards the end plates of the detector. The Bethe formula describes how these particles lose energy.

Multiwire proportional counters or solid-state counters are used as detection media, because they provide signals with pulse heights proportional to ionization strength. An avalanche effect in the vicinity of the anode wires strung in the readout chambers gives the necessary signal amplification. The positive ions created in the avalanche induce a positive current signal on the pad plane. The readout is performed by the 557,568 pads, located at the end plates, which form the cathode plane of the multi-wire proportional chambers. This gives the radial distance and azimuth to the beam. The last coordinate necessary to locate the ion, the distance along the beam direction, is given by the drift time. Since the measurements can vary considerably, a great may are taken to provide optimal resolution.

Almost the entirety of the TPC's volume is sensitive to charged particles passing through. The TPC is ideal for environment like heavy-ion collisions, in which the number of particles to be tracked can easily be in the thousands. ALICE's TPC samples the ionization strength of all particle tracks up to 159 times. This allows it to have an ionization measurement resolution as low as 5%.

==== Transition Radiation Detector ====
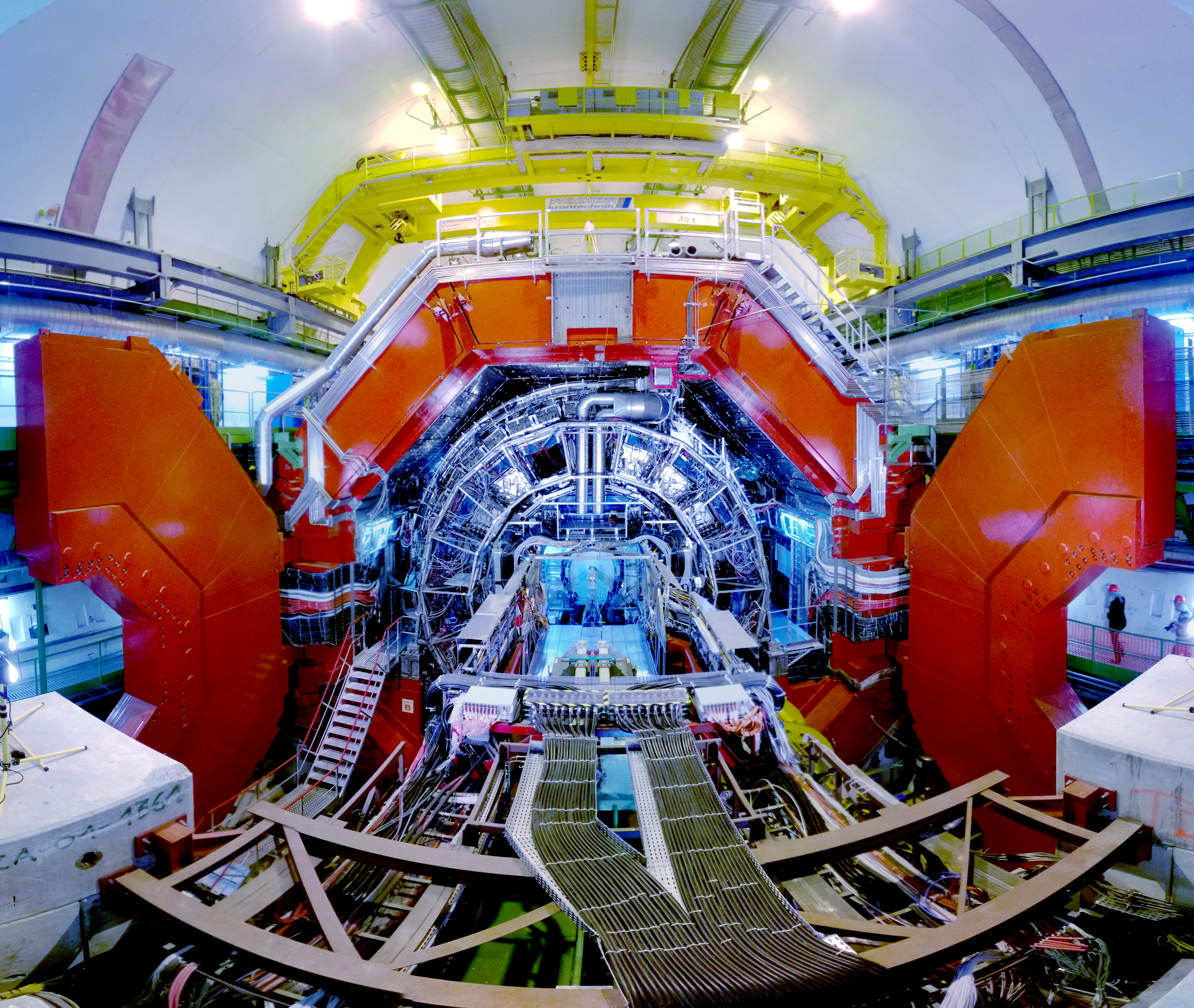
The completed ALICE detector showing the eighteen TRD modules (the radially-arranged trapezoidal prisms).

Electrons and positrons can be distinguished from other charged particles by detecting transition radiation, that is, X-rays emitted when the particles cross many layers of thin materials. This allows for electrons and positrons to be identified by a transition radiation detector (TRD). To develop the TRD for ALICE many detector prototypes were tested, using mixed beams of pions and electrons.

=== Particle identification with ALICE ===
ALICE is also intended to determine the identity of each particle it detects. This can be accomplished by determining their mass and charge. The mass cannot be directly measured, but can be determined from the momentum and velocity, both of which can be measured. Velocity can be determined by any of four methods based on time-of-flight, ionization, transition radiation, and Cherenkov radiation. ALICE often combines these methods when making measurements. Momentum, as well as whether the charge is positive or negative, can be determined by observing how the particle's path bends in a magnetic field.

In addition to the information given by ITS and TPC, more specialized detectors are needed: the TOF measures the time that each particle takes to travel from the vertex to reach it, allowing determination of its speed. This measurement is precise to less than 10 nanoseconds. The High Momentum Particle Identification Detector (HMPID) measures the faint light patterns generated by fast particles, and the transient radiation detector (TRD) measures the radiation very fast particles emit when crossing different materials, thus allowing it to identify electrons. Muons are measured by exploiting the fact that they penetrate matter more easily than most other particles. In the forward region a very thick and complex absorber stops all other particles and muons are measured by a dedicated set of detectors called the muon spectrometer.

==== Time of Flight ====
ALICE's TOF system measures the velocity of charged particles by measuring how long it takes them to go a given distance along their trajectory. Using the tracking information from other detectors every track firing a sensor is identified. Provided the momentum is also known, the mass of the particle can then be derived from these measurements. The TOF detector is based on multigap resistive plate chambers, or MRPCs. These pads are distributed over a 141 m^{2} cylindrical surface with an inner radius of 3.7 m.

The MRPCs are made of sheets of standard window glass, separated by fishing line. These provide narrow gaps for gas, across which high electrical fields are applied. Each MRPC has 10 gas gaps. This system is highly efficient, nearing 100% detector efficiency.

The simplicity of the MRPCs allow for the relatively cheap construction of a large number of them. Despite being relatively cheap, they have a TOF resolution of 80ps, making it possible to distinguish kaons, pions, and protons at momenta up to a few GeV/c. Combining these measurements with those from the TPC has proven a particularly effective technique for distinguishing different types of particles.

==== High Momentum Particle Identification Detector ====
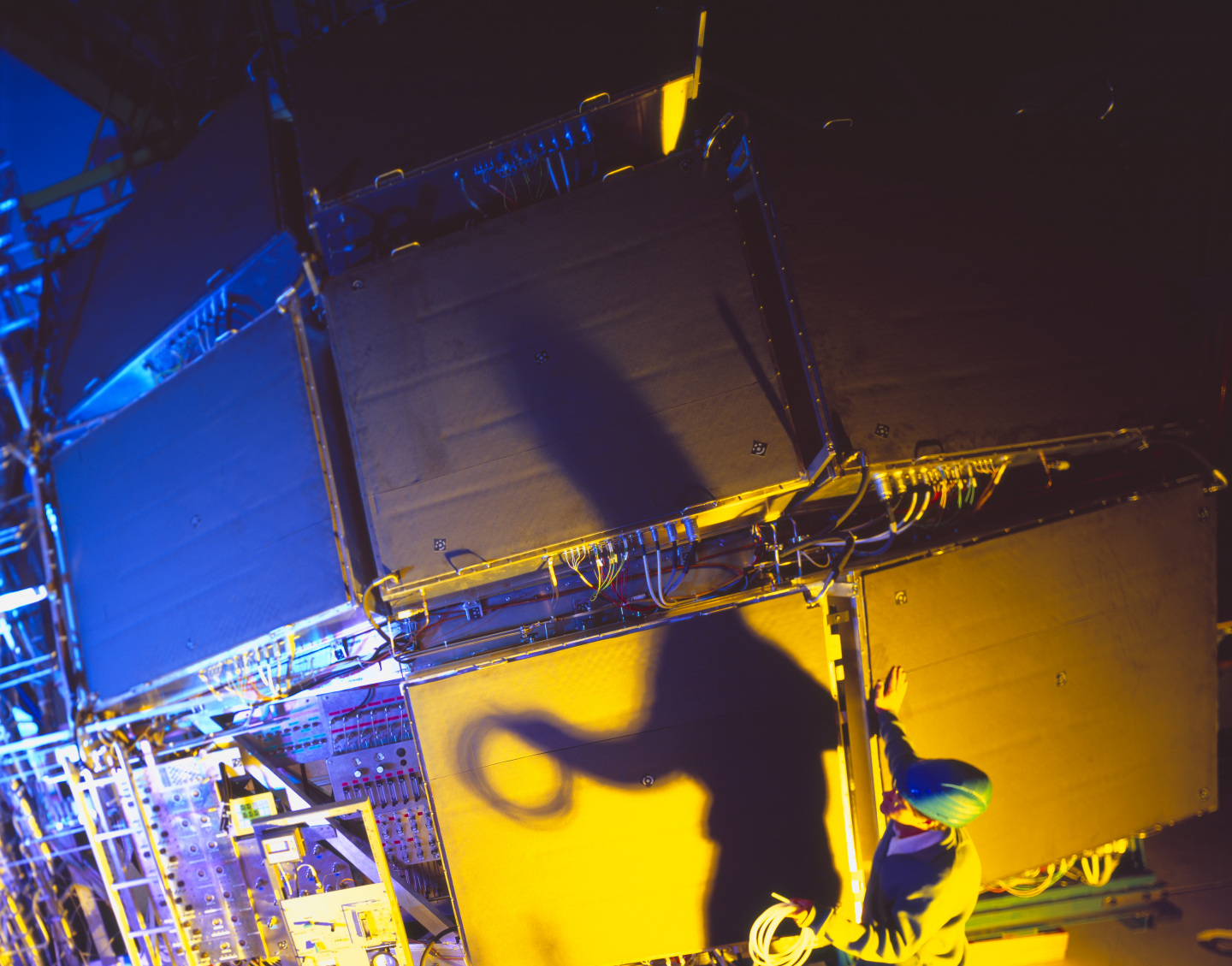
The HMPID detector before final installation inside the ALICE magnet.

The High Momentum Particle Identification Detector (HMPID) is a ring imaging Cherenkov (RICH) detector used to determine the speed of particles beyond the momentum range available through energy loss (in ITS and TPC, momenta above 600 MeV) and through time-of-flight measurements (in TOF, momenta above 1.2–1.4 GeV).

Cherenkov radiation consists of photons produced by charged particles moving faster than the speed of light in a material. The angle at which these photons are released (relative to the particle's motion) depends on the particle's velocity. Cherenkov detectors detect this radiation and consist of two parts: a material the radiation is released in and a photon detector. Ring imaging Cherenkov (RICH) detectors detect the ring-shaped image this produces, allowing them to measure the angle the photons were released at and therefore the velocity of the particle that produced them. This allows for determination of the mass of the charged particle.

In a dense medium with a large refractive index, only a thin radiator layer—no more than a few centimetres—is needed to emit a sufficient number of Cherenkov photons. The photon detector is positioned some distance behind the radiator (typically about 10 cm), allowing enough room for the Cherenkov light cone to expand and form the characteristic ring-shaped image. A proximity-focusing RICH detector of this type is installed in the ALICE experiment.

ALICE HMPID's momentum range is up to 3 GeV for pion/kaon discrimination and up to 5 GeV for kaon/proton discrimination. It is the world's largest caesium iodide RICH detector, with an active area of 11 m^{2}. A prototype was successfully tested at CERN in 1997 and currently takes data at the Relativistic Heavy Ion Collider at the Brookhaven National Laboratory in the US.

=== Calorimeters ===
Calorimeters measure the energy of particles and determine whether they undergo electromagnetic or hadronic interactions. Particle identification in a calorimeter is a destructive measurement. All particles except muons and neutrinos deposit their entire energy in the calorimeter system by producing electromagnetic or hadronic showers. Photons, electrons, and positrons deposit all their energy in the electromagnetic calorimeter. Their showers are indistinguishable, but a photon can be identified by the absence of a track in the tracking system associated with the shower.

Photons (particles of light), such as those emitted by a hot object, provide information about the temperature of the system. To measure them, special detectors are required. The crystals of the Photon Spectrometer (PHOS), which are as dense as lead and as transparent as glass, measure photons with exceptional precision in a limited region. In contrast, the Photon Multiplicity Detector (PMD) and the Electro-Magnetic Calorimeter (EMCal) cover a much wider area. The EMCal also detects groups of closely spaced particles, called "jets," which retain information about the early stages of the event.

==== Photon Spectrometer ====
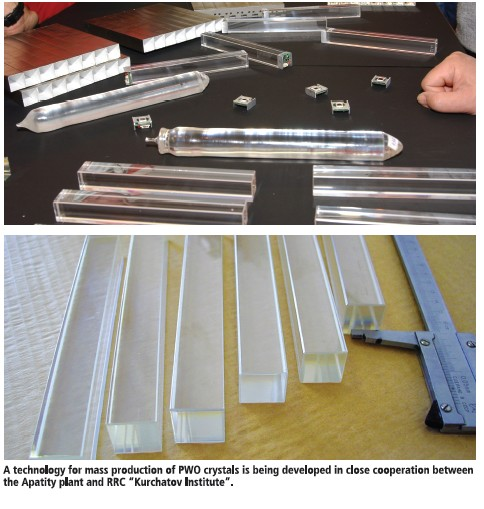
A technology for mass production of PWO crystals has been developed in close cooperation between CERN, the Apatity plant and RRC "Kurchatov Institute".

PHOS is a high-resolution electromagnetic calorimeter installed in ALICE to study the initial phase of the collision by measuring photons coming directly from the collision. It is made of lead tungstate crystals, similar to the ones used by CMS, read out using avalanche photodiodes.

When high-energy photons strike lead tungstate, they make it glow, or scintillate, and this glow can be measured. Lead tungstate is extremely dense (denser than iron), stopping most photons that reach it. The crystals are kept at a temperature of 248 K, which helps to increase the energy resolution by decreasing noise and to optimize the response for low energies.

==== Electro-Magnetic Calorimeter ====
The EMCal is a lead-scintillator sampling calorimeter made of almost 13,000 individual towers, grouped into ten super-modules. Data from the scintillators is read out by wavelength-shifting optical fibers in a Shashlik geometry, connected to an avalanche photodiode. The EMCal covers almost the full length of the ALICE Time Projection Chamber and central detector, and a third of its azimuth placed back-to-back with the PHOS.

The super-modules are inserted into an independent support frame located within the ALICE magnet, between the time-of-flight counters and the magnet coil. The support frame itself is a complex structure: it weighs 20 tons and must support five times its own weight, with a maximum deflection between being empty and being fully loaded of only a couple of centimeters. Installation of the eight-ton super-modules requires a system of rails with a sophisticated insertion device to bridge across to the support structure.

==== Photon Multiplicity Detector ====
The Photon Multiplicity Detector is a particle shower detector that measures the multiplicity and spatial distribution of photons produced in the collisions. It utilizes as a first layer a veto detector, which rejects charged particles. Photons pass through a converter, initiating an electromagnetic shower in a second detector layer, where they produce large signals on several cells of its sensitive volume. Hadrons however normally affect only one cell, and therefore produce a signal representing minimum-ionizing particles.

==== Forward Multiplicity Detector ====
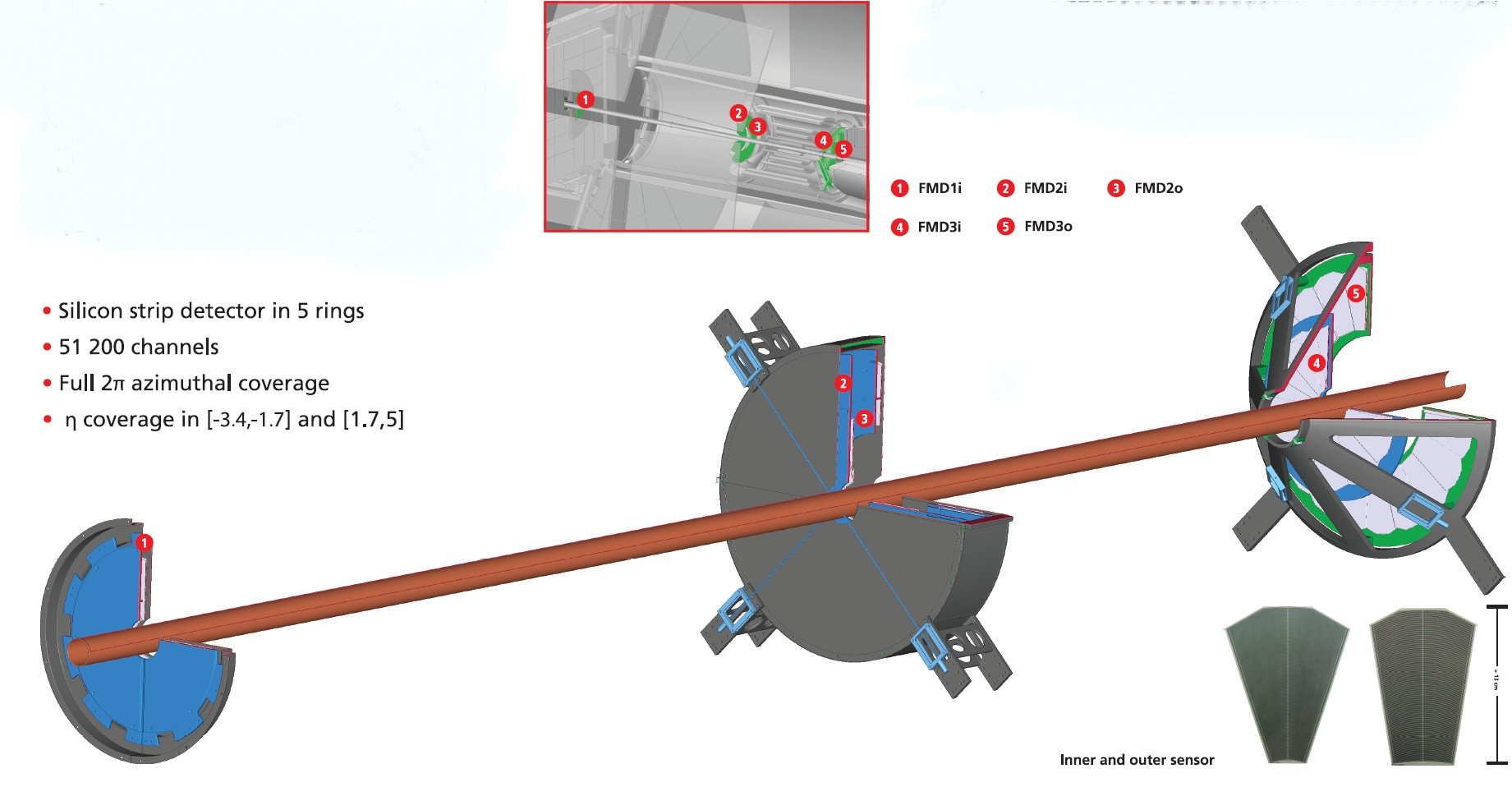
ALICE Forward Multiplicity Detector

The Forward Multiplicity Detector (FMD) extends the coverage for multiplicity of charge particles into the forward regions, giving ALICE the widest coverage of the 4 LHC experiments for these measurements.

The FMD consists of 5 large silicon discs, each with 10,240 individual detector channels. It is used to measure the charged particles emitted at small angles relative to the beam. FMD provides an independent measurement of the position of the collisions in the vertical plane, which can be used with measurements from the barrel detector to investigate flow, jets, etc.

==== Muon Spectrometer ====
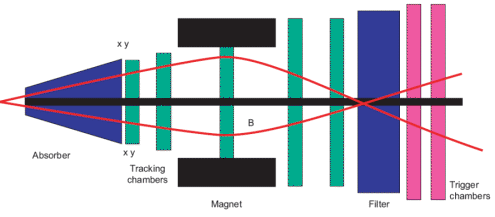
The main components of the ALICE muon spectrometer: an absorber to filter the background, a set of tracking chambers before, inside and after the magnet and a set of trigger chambers.

Muons may be identified by using the fact that that they are the only penetrating charged particle. This is because muons with less than several hundred GeV/c of momentum do not produce electromagnetic showers, and because they are leptons, and so do not interact via the strong force with atomic nuclei they pass through or near. This allows muons to be identified simply by placing muon detectors behind calorimeters or thick absorbers. Muons are thus the only charged particle capable of reaching these detectors.

The muon spectrometer is located in the forward region of ALICE. It includes an iron wall 1.2 m thick as a muon filter, as well as a complex absorber. A dedicated set of detectors precisely measures muon candidates that penetrate the absorbers.

=== Characterization of the collision ===
It is necessary for ALICE to be able to determine the strength of particle collisions. This is done by measuring the remnants of the colliding nuclei in detectors made of high density materials, which are located about 110 metres on both sides of ALICE (the Zero Degree Calorimeters) and by measuring with the FMD, V0 detector, and T0 detector the number of particles produced in the collision and their spatial distribution. The T0 detector also measures with high precision the time when the event takes place.

==== Zero degree calorimeter ====
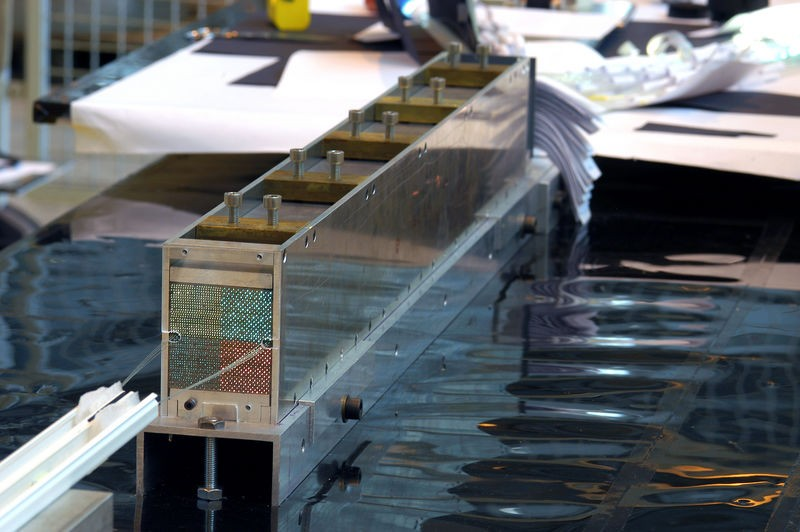
Front face of the ZN calorimeter: One of the two ZN calorimeters during assembly. The quartz fibers are hosted in the 1936 grooves of the W-alloy slabs.

The zero degree calorimeters (ZDCs) are calorimeters that detect the energy of the spectator nucleons in order to determine the overlap region of the two colliding nuclei. It is composed of four calorimeters, two to detect protons (ZP) and two to detect neutrons (ZN). They are located 115 meters away from the interaction point on both sides, exactly along the beam line. The ZN is placed at zero degrees with respect to the LHC beam axis, between the two beam pipes. That is why they are called zero degree calorimeters. The ZP is positioned externally to the outgoing beam pipe. The spectator protons are separated from the ion beams by means of the dipole magnet D1.

The ZDCs are "spaghetti calorimeters", made by a stack of heavy metal plates grooved to allocate a matrix of quartz fibers. Their principle of operation is based on the detection of the Cherenkov light produced as the charged particles produced in the fibers as the result of a particle shower.

==== V0 detector ====
The V0 detector is made of two arrays of scintillator counters set on either side of the ALICE interaction point, called V0-A and V0-C. The V0-C counter is located upstream of the dimuon arm absorber and cover the spectrometer acceptance, while the V0-A counter is located around 3.5 m away from the collision vertex, on the other side.

It is used to estimate the centrality of the collision by summing up the energy deposited in the two disks of V0. This value scales directly with the number of primary particles generated in the collision and therefore to the centrality.

V0 is also used as reference in Van Der Meer scans that give the size and shape of colliding beams and therefore the luminosity delivered to the experiment.

==== T0 detector ====
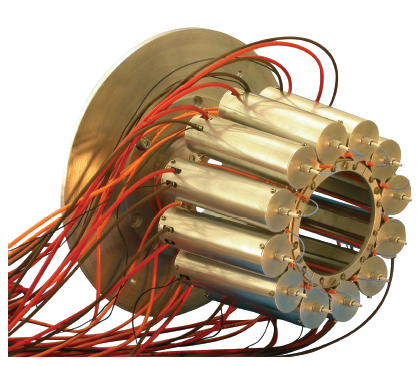
An array of Cherenkov counters used in the ALICE T0 detector.

ALICE's T0 detector serves as a start, trigger and luminosity detector for ALICE. The accurate interaction time (start) serves as the reference signal for the Time-of-Flight detector that is used for particle identification. T0 supplies five different trigger signals to the Central Trigger Processor. The most important of these is the T0 vertex, providing prompt and accurate confirmation of the location of the primary interaction point along the beam axis within the set boundaries. The detector is also used for online luminosity monitoring, providing fast feedback to the accelerator team.

The T0 detector consists of two arrays of Cherenkov counters (T0-C and T0-A) positioned at the opposite sides of the interaction point (IP). Each array has 12 cylindrical counters, equipped with a quartz radiator and a photomultiplier tube.

=== ALICE Cosmic Rays Detector (ACORDE) ===
The ALICE cavern provides an ideal place for the detection of high energy atmospheric muons coming from cosmic ray showers. The ALICE Cosmic Rays detector (ACORDE) detects cosmic ray showers by detecting the arrival of muons to the top of the ALICE magnet.

The ALICE cosmic ray trigger is made of 60 scintillator modules distributed on the three upper faces of the ALICE magnet yoke. The array can be configured to trigger on single or multi-muon events, from 2-fold coincidences up to the whole array if desired. ACORDE's high luminosity allows the recording of cosmic events with very high numbers of parallel muon tracks, the so-called muon bundles.

With ACORDE, the ALICE Experiment has been able to detect muon bundles with the highest multiplicity ever registered as well as to indirectly measure very high energy primary cosmic rays.

== Data acquisition ==
ALICE requires a data acquisition system that can function both during the very frequent small events of proton-proton operation and the relatively infrequent but large events of Pb-Pb operation.

ALICE therefore needs to be able to both manage the constant stream of data from central collisions and to distinguish and record rare cross-section processes. It therefore has an event building bandwidth of up 2.5 GB/s and the ability to store data at up to 1.25 GB/s.

The physical hardware of the DAQ system is fairly standard. The event building network is composed of PCs running Linux and standard Ethernet switches. These PCs are then connected in a DAQ fabric to achieve the necessary performances. The Mass Storage System consists of two parts: Global Data Storage, doing temporary data storage in the experimental area; and Permanent Data Storage, doing long-term data archiving.

== Results ==
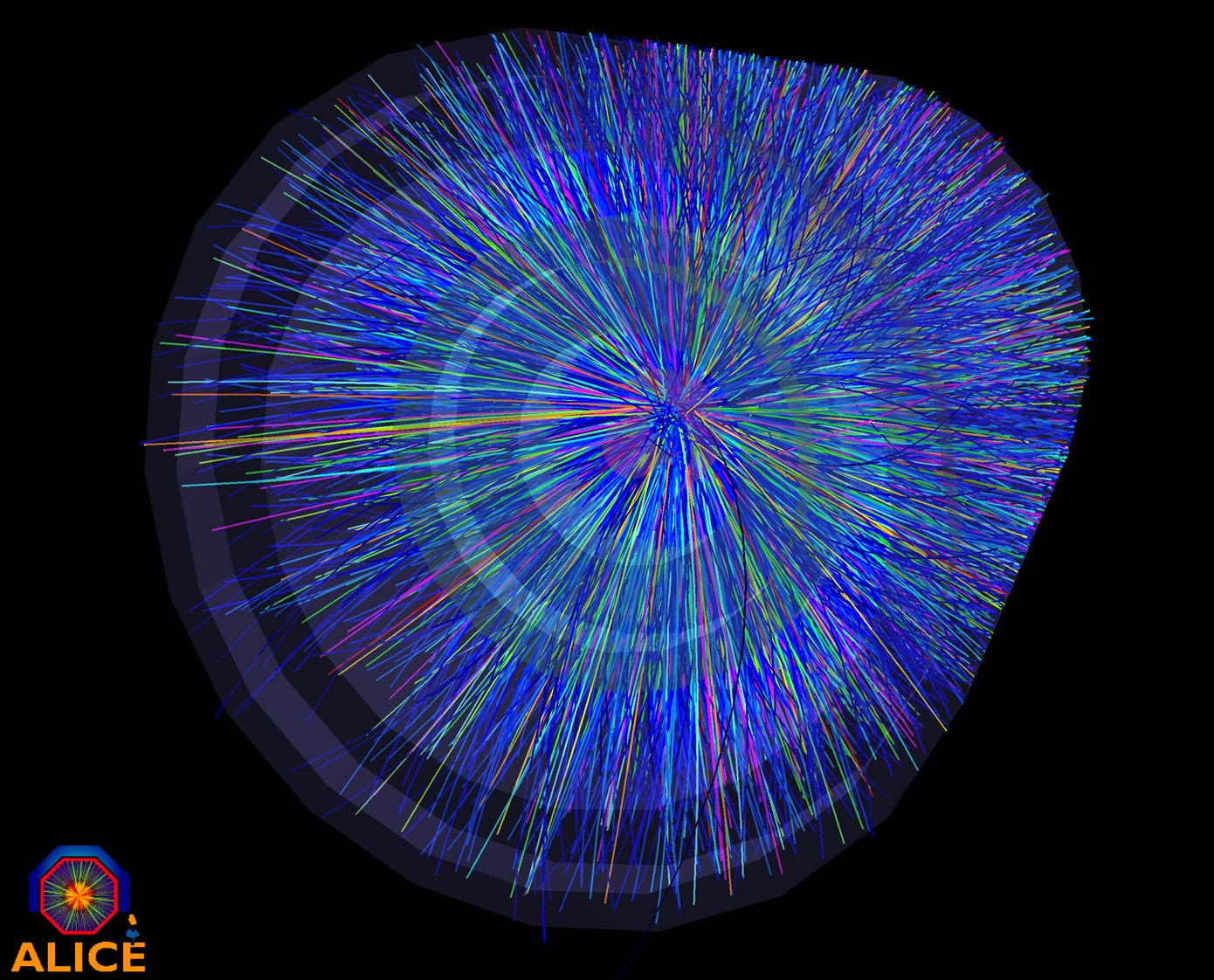
Events recorded by the ALICE experiment from the first lead ion collisions, at a centre-of-mass energy of 2.76 TeV per nucleon pair.

The physics program of ALICE includes the following main topics:

- the study of the thermalization of partons in the quark-gluon plasma (QGP), with focus on the massive charm and beauty quarks and understanding the behavior of these heavy quarks in relation to the strongly coupled medium of QGP
- the study of the mechanisms of energy loss that occur in the QGP medium and the dependencies of energy loss on the parton species
- the dissociation of quarkonium states, which can be a probe of deconfinement and of the temperature of the medium
- the production of thermal photons and low-mass dileptons emitted by the QGP, which allows for assessing the initial temperature and degrees of freedom of the systems as well as the chiral nature of the phase transition.

The ALICE collaboration presented its first results from LHC proton collisions at a centre-of-mass energy of 7 TeV in March 2010. The results confirmed that the charged-particle multiplicity is rising with energy faster than expected while the shape of the multiplicity distribution is not reproduced well by standard simulations. The results were based on the analysis of a sample of 300,000 proton–proton collisions the ALICE experiment collected during the first runs of the LHC with stable beams at a centre-of-mass energy of 7 TeV.

In 2011, the ALICE Collaboration measured the size of the system created in Pb-Pb collisions at a centre-of-mass energy of 2.76 TeV per nucleon pair. ALICE confirmed that the QCD matter created in Pb-Pb collisions behaves like a fluid, as expected by hydrodynamic equations.

=== A perfect liquid at the LHC ===
Off-center nuclear collisions, with a finite impact parameter, create a very asymmetric "almond-shaped" fireball. However, experiments cannot measure the spatial dimensions of the interaction (except in special cases, for example in the production of pions). Instead, they measure the momentum distributions of the emitted particles. A correlation between the measured azimuthal momentum distribution of particles emitted from the decaying fireball and the initial spatial asymmetry can arise only from multiple interactions between the constituents of the created matter; that is, the distribution provides information about how the matter flows, which is related to its equation of state and its thermodynamic transport properties.

The measured azimuthal distribution of particles in momentum space can be decomposed into Fourier coefficients. The second Fourier coefficient, called elliptic flow, is particularly sensitive to the internal friction or viscosity of the fluid, or more precisely, η/s, the ratio of the shear viscosity (η) to entropy (s) of the system. For a "thin" liquid such as water, the η/s ratio is small. A "thick" liquid, such as honey, has large values of η/s.

In heavy-ion collisions at the LHC, the ALICE collaboration found that the hot matter created in the collision behaves like a fluid with little friction, with η/s close to its lower limit, that is, almost zero viscosity.

=== Measuring the highest temperature on Earth ===
In August 2012, ALICE scientists announced that their experiments produced quark–gluon plasma with temperatures of around 5.5 trillion kelvin (470 MeV), the highest temperature matter achieved in any physical experiments thus far. This temperature is about 38% higher than the previous record of about 4 trillion kelvin (340 MeV), achieved in the 2010 experiments at the Brookhaven National Laboratory.

The ALICE results were announced at the August 13 Quark Matter 2012 conference in Washington, D.C. The quark–gluon plasma produced by these experiments approximates the conditions in the universe that existed microseconds after the Big Bang, before matter coalesced into atoms.

=== Energy loss ===
A basic process in QCD is the energy loss of a fast parton in a medium composed of color charges. This phenomenon, "jet quenching", is especially useful in the study of QGP, using the naturally occurring jets produced from the hard scattering of quarks and gluons from the incoming nuclei. A highly energetic parton (a color charge) probes the colored medium similarly to how an X-ray probes ordinary matter. The production of these partonic probes in hadronic collisions is well understood within perturbative QCD. The theory also shows that a parton traversing the medium will lose a fraction of its energy by emitting many low energy gluons. The amount of radiated energy is proportional to the density of the medium and to the square of the path length travelled by the parton in the medium. Theory also predicts that the energy loss depends on the flavor of the parton.

Jet quenching was first observed at RHIC by measuring the yield rates of hadrons with high transverse momentum. These particles are produced via fragmentation of energetic partons. The yields of these high transverse momentum particles in central nucleus–nucleus collisions were found from the measurements in proton–proton reactions to be a factor of five lower than expected. ALICE has recently published measurements of charged particles in central heavy-ion collisions at the LHC. As at RHIC, the production of high transverse momentum hadrons at the LHC is significantly lower than expected. However, the observations at the LHC show qualitatively new features. The observation from ALICE is consistent with reports from the ATLAS and CMS collaborations on direct evidence for parton energy loss within heavy-ion collisions. These reports are based on fully reconstructed back-to-back jets of particles associated with hard parton scatterings. The latter two experiments have shown a strong energy imbalance between the jet and its recoiling partner. This imbalance is thought to arise because one of the jets traversed the hot and dense matter, transferring a substantial fraction of its energy to the medium in a way that is not recovered by the reconstruction of the jets.

=== Studying quarkonium hadroproduction ===
Quarkonia are bound states of heavy flavour (charm or bottom) quarks and their antiquarks. Two types of quarkonia have been extensively studied: charmonia, which consist of a charm quark and an anti-charm, and bottomonia, made of a bottom and an anti-bottom quark. Charm and anticharm quarks in the presence of QGP, in which there are many free color charges, are not able to "see" each other any more and therefore they cannot form bound states. The "melting" of quarkonia into the QGP manifests itself in the suppression of the quarkonium yields compared to the production rates without the presence of the QGP. The search for quarkonia suppression as a QGP signature started 25 years ago. The first ALICE results for charm hadrons in Pb-Pb collisions at a center-of-mass energy of 2.76 TeV indicate strong energy loss in the medium for charm and strange quarks. This is an indication of the formation of the hot medium of QGP.

As the temperature increases so does the colour screening, resulting in greater suppression of the quarkonium states as it is more difficult for charm–anticharm or bottom–antibottom pairs to form new bound states. At very high temperatures no quarkonium states are expected to survive; they melt in the QGP. Quarkonium sequential suppression is therefore considered a QGP thermometer, as states with different masses have different sizes and are expected to be screened and dissociated at different temperatures. However, as the collision energy increases, so does the number of charm-anticharm quarks that can form bound states, and a balancing mechanism of recombination of quarkonia may appear at higher energies.

The results from the first ALICE run differ from observations at lower energies. While a similar suppression is observed at LHC energies for peripheral collisions, with increasingly head-on collisions – as quantified by the increasing number of nucleons in the lead nuclei participating in the interaction – the suppression no longer increases. Therefore, despite the higher temperatures attained in the nuclear collisions at the LHC, more J/ψ mesons are detected by the ALICE experiment in Pb–Pb collisions than in p–p collisions. Such an effect is likely to be related to a regeneration process occurring at the temperature boundary between the QGP and a hot gas of hadrons.

The suppression of charmonium states was also observed in proton–lead collisions at the LHC, in which quark-gluon plasma is not formed. This suggests that the observed suppression in proton–nucleus collisions is due to cold nuclear matter effects. Today there is a large amount of data available from RHIC and LHC on charmonium and bottomonium suppression, and ALICE is used in attempts to distinguish between effects due to the formation of the QGP and those from cold nuclear matter effects.

=== Turning lead into gold ===
In May 2025, the ALICE experiment team at the Large Hadron Collider announced that nearly 260 billion gold-203 nuclei (a very small amount massing about 90 picograms) were produced from induced photon swaps in deliberate near-miss collisions of lead-208 nuclei during three experiment runs in the late 2010s.

== Upgrades and future plans ==
=== Long Shutdown 1 (2013-2015) ===
The main upgrade activity performed on ALICE during LHC's Long Shutdown 1 was to be the installation of the dijet calorimeter (DCAL), an extension of the preexisting EMCAL system that added 60° of azimuthal acceptance opposite the preexisting 120° of the EMCAL's acceptance. This new subdetector was to be installed on the bottom of the solenoid magnet, which previously housed three modules of the photon spectrometer (PHOS). Moreover, an entirely new rail system and cradle was to be installed to support the three PHOS modules and eight DCAL modules, which together weigh more than 100 tonnes. The installation of five modules of the TRD was to completed this complex detector system, which consists of 18 units.

In addition to these mainstream detector activities, all of the 18 ALICE subdetectors were to undergo major improvements during LS1 while the computers and discs of the online systems were replaced, followed by upgrades of the operating systems and online software.

All of these efforts were to ensure that ALICE was in good shape for the three-year LHC running period after LS1, with heavy-ion collisions at the top LHC energy of 5.5 TeV/nucleon at luminosities in excess of 1027 Hz/cm^{2}.

=== Long Shutdown 2 (2018–2021) ===
The ALICE collaboration planned for a major upgrade during Long Shutdown 2 (LS2), which was scheduled for 2018. Then the entire silicon tracker was to be replaced by a monolithic-pixel tracker system built from ALPIDE chips; the time-projection chamber was to be upgraded with gaseous electron-multiplier (GEM) detectors for continuous read-out and the use of new microelectronics; and all of the other subdetectors and the online systems were to prepare for a 100-fold increase in the number of events written to tape.
