= Scattering and Neutrino Detector =

Large Hadron Collider (LHC)
- Plan of the LHC experiments and the preaccelerators.

LHC experiments
- ATLAS: A Toroidal LHC Apparatus
- CMS: Compact Muon Solenoid
- LHCb: LHC-beauty
- ALICE: A Large Ion Collider Experiment
- TOTEM: Total Cross Section, Elastic Scattering and Diffraction Dissociation
- LHCf: LHC-forward
- MoEDAL: Monopole and Exotics Detector At the LHC
- FASER: ForwArd Search ExpeRiment
- SND: Scattering and Neutrino Detector

LHC preaccelerators
- p and Pb: Linear accelerators for protons (Linac 4) and lead (Linac 3)
- (not marked): Proton Synchrotron Booster
- PS: Proton Synchrotron
- SPS: Super Proton Synchrotron

The Scattering and Neutrino Detector (SND) at the Large Hadron Collider (LHC), CERN, is an experiment built for the detection of the collider neutrinos. The primary goal of SND is to measure the p+p --> $\mathrm{\nu}$+X process and search for the feebly interacting particles. It has become operational in 2022, during the LHC-Run 3 (2022-2024). SND has been installed in an empty tunnel- TI18 that links the LHC and Super Proton Synchrotron, 480m away from the ATLAS experiment interaction point in the far forward region and along the beam collision axis.

In February 2020, the Search for Hidden Particle (SHiP) collaboration expressed its interest in neutrino-measurement to the LHC Council (LHCC). The letter of intent for SND was presented in August 2020. Based on LHCC's recommendation, the Letter of intent was followed by the Technical Design report presented in February 2021. The experiment was later approved in March 2021 by the CERN Research Board to be the ninth experiment at LHC. In 2023, SND@LHC and FASER reported the first observation of collider neutrinos, followed by a measurement of the muon flux in 2024.

== Physics potential and goals ==
The SND will cover a wide range of physics, such as detecting all three neutrino flavors in the pseudorapidity (angular) range that has never been explored before. Along with the FASERnu detector at LHC, it will be the first experiment to observe and study the collider neutrinos. It will also search for Beyond Standard Model particles such as Feebly Interacting Particles and particles that could make up the dark matter.

=== Physics with neutrinos ===
SND will primarily observe neutrinos in the pseudorapidity range of 7.2 to 8.6. It will detect the scattering properties of the neutrinos in this yet unexplored range and complement the observation range of FASERnu. The neutrinos in this range come from the decay of heavy quarks such as charm decays (c → s + $\mathrm{W^{\pm}}$ : charm quark decaying into a strange quark and a W boson), and hence SND aims to give valuable insights into the physics of heavy quark production. The charmed-hadron production studies will also provide data to constrain the gluon parton distribution function in the low Bjorken-x region. In its first operational run, i.e. the LHC's Run-3 between 2022 and 2025, SND is expected to detect and study about 2000 high-energy neutrinos.

=== Physics with feebly interacting particles ===
The Feebly Interacting Particles (FIPs) are theorized to be produced in the proton-proton collisions. SND has the potential to detect two types of FIPs; stable FIPs by observing their scattering from the atoms (mostly protons) in the detector target section, and unstable FIPs which could decay inside the detector itself. The light-dark matter particles hypothesized with scattering properties similar to the neutrinos, and which interact with the Standard Model particles through 'portal mediators', could also be possibly detected as FIPs, although they will have to be separated from the neutrino scattering background. One basic criterion for such a separation would be to observe the number of inelastic and elastic collision events. Neutrinos usually scatter inelastically due to the high mass of their mediators (W and Z bosons). Thus more than the predicted number of elastic collisions will hint at light dark matter scattering events.

== See also ==
- FASERnu experiment at LHC
- List of LHC experiments
