= MoEDAL experiment =

Particle physics experiment

Coordinates: 46.235753°N 6.055092°E

Large Hadron Collider (LHC)
- Plan of the LHC experiments and the preaccelerators.

LHC experiments
- ATLAS: A Toroidal LHC Apparatus
- CMS: Compact Muon Solenoid
- LHCb: LHC-beauty
- ALICE: A Large Ion Collider Experiment
- TOTEM: Total Cross Section, Elastic Scattering and Diffraction Dissociation
- LHCf: LHC-forward
- MoEDAL: Monopole and Exotics Detector At the LHC
- FASER: ForwArd Search ExpeRiment
- SND: Scattering and Neutrino Detector

LHC preaccelerators
- p and Pb: Linear accelerators for protons (Linac 4) and lead (Linac 3)
- (not marked): Proton Synchrotron Booster
- PS: Proton Synchrotron
- SPS: Super Proton Synchrotron

MoEDAL (Monopole and Exotics Detector at the LHC) is a particle physics experiment at the Large Hadron Collider (LHC).

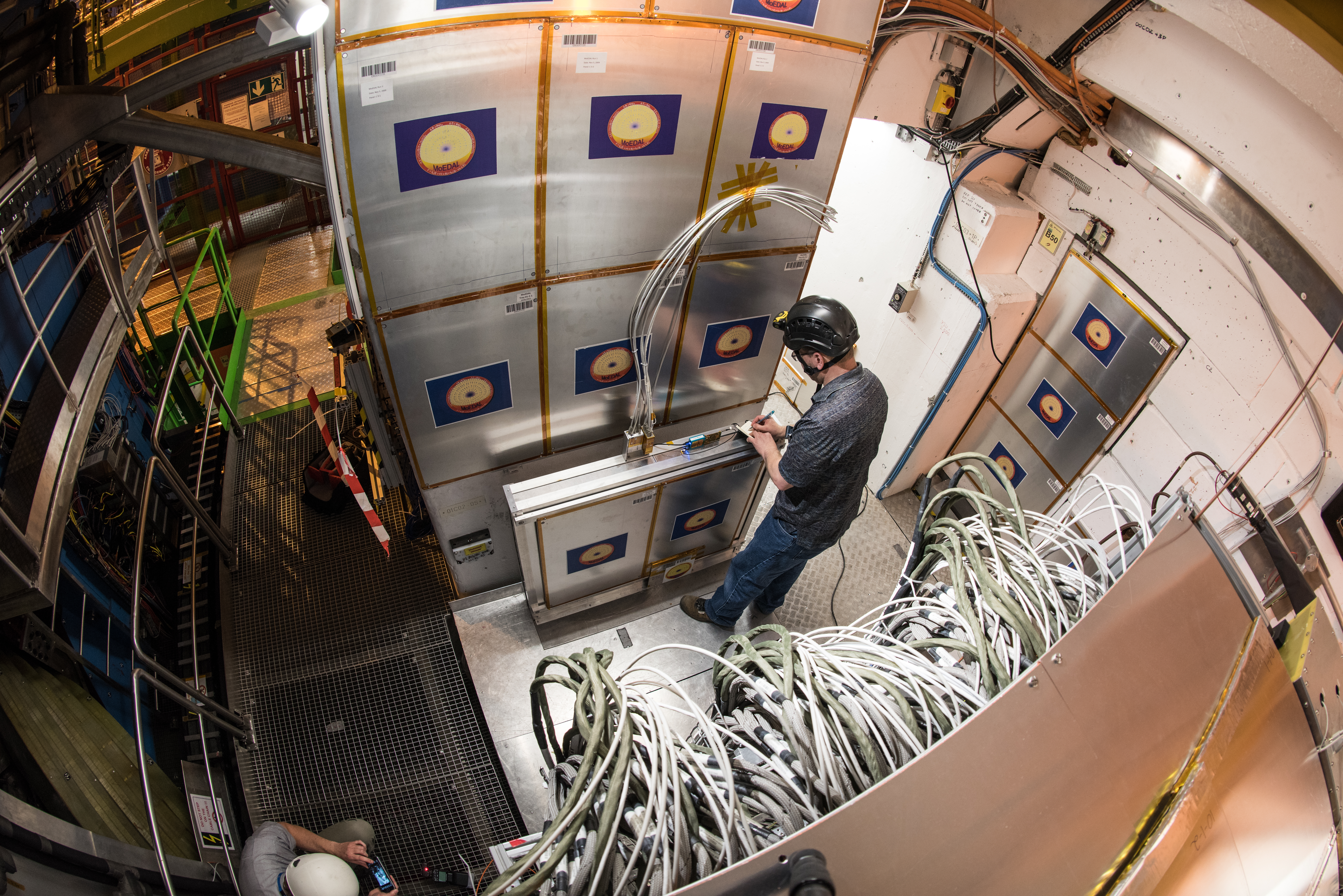
MoEDAL experiment in LHC IP8 at CERN

== Experiment ==
MoEDAL shares the cavern at Point 8 with LHCb, and its prime goal is to directly search for the magnetic monopole or dyon and other highly ionizing stable massive particles and pseudo-stable massive particles.

To detect these particles, MoEDAL uses both nuclear track detectors and aluminium trapping volumes. There are approximately 10 m^{2} of nuclear track detectors placed around the interaction point. These suffer characteristic damage due to highly ionizing particles, such as magnetic monopoles or highly electrically charged particles. MoEDAL also has approximately 800 kg of aluminium bars placed around the interaction point, that can trap stable massive particles for later study. Passing these bars through a SQUID magnetometer yields a sensitive test for the presence of magnetic monopoles.

MoEDAL is an international research collaboration whose spokesperson is James Pinfold, from the University of Alberta. It is the seventh experiment at the LHC, was approved and sanctioned by the CERN research board in May 2010, and started its first test deployment in January 2011.

In 2012, MoEDAL accuracy surpassed accuracy of similar experiments. A new detector was installed in 2015, but as of 2017 it also did not find any magnetic monopoles, setting new limits on their production cross section. In 2022, they performed a search for magnetic monopoles produced via the Schwinger effect. The absence of a positive signal implies direct lower bounds on the mass of possible magnetic monopoles.
