= LHCf experiment =

Experiment at CERN's Large Hadron Collider

Coordinates: 46°14′09″N 6°03′18″E

Large Hadron Collider (LHC)
- Plan of the LHC experiments and the preaccelerators.

LHC experiments
- ATLAS: A Toroidal LHC Apparatus
- CMS: Compact Muon Solenoid
- LHCb: LHC-beauty
- ALICE: A Large Ion Collider Experiment
- TOTEM: Total Cross Section, Elastic Scattering and Diffraction Dissociation
- LHCf: LHC-forward
- MoEDAL: Monopole and Exotics Detector At the LHC
- FASER: ForwArd Search ExpeRiment
- SND: Scattering and Neutrino Detector

LHC preaccelerators
- p and Pb: Linear accelerators for protons (Linac 4) and lead (Linac 3)
- (not marked): Proton Synchrotron Booster
- PS: Proton Synchrotron
- SPS: Super Proton Synchrotron

The LHCf (Large Hadron Collider forward) is a special-purpose Large Hadron Collider experiment for astroparticle (cosmic ray) physics, and one of nine detectors in the LHC accelerator at CERN. LHCf is designed to study the particles generated in the forward region of collisions, those almost directly in line with the colliding proton beams.

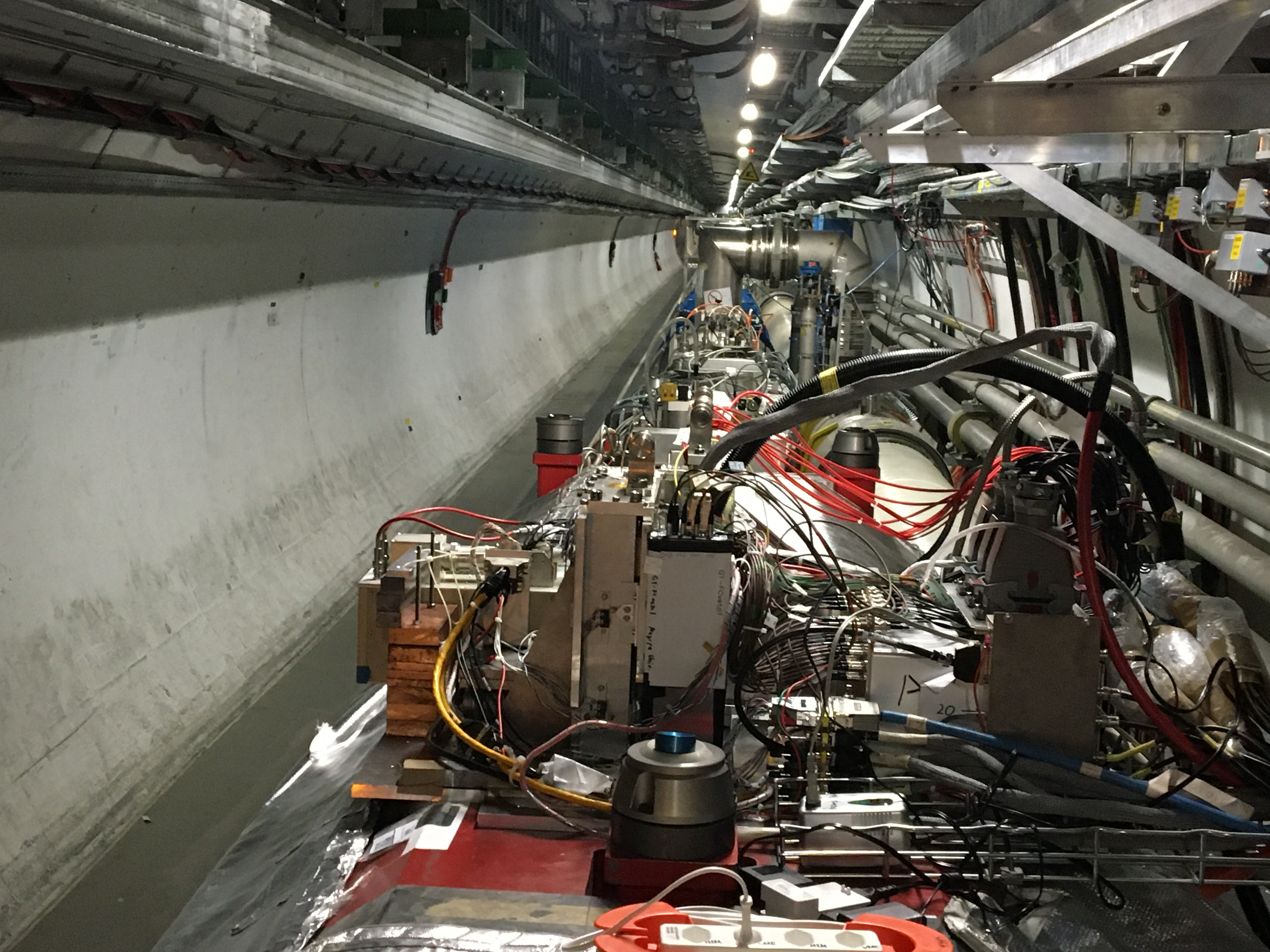
The LHCf experiment in the LHC tunnel

== Purpose ==
The LHCf is intended to measure the energy and numbers of neutral pions (π^{0}) produced by the collider. This will hopefully help explain the origin of ultra-high-energy cosmic rays (UHECRs). Detecting UHECRs is performed through observations of secondary particle showers produced when a UHECR interacts with the atmosphere. The LHCf experiment is designed to measure the very-forward region, where most of the energy flow of secondary particles is contained.

The results produced by the LHCf experiment complement other high-energy cosmic ray measurements from the Pierre Auger Observatory in Argentina, and the Telescope Array Project in Utah.

== Experimental setup ==
The LHCf setup consists of two independent detectors on either side of the LHC, both 140 m from the ATLAS interaction point. The detectors are referred to as Arm 1 and Arm 2 and are installed inside target neutral absorbers (TAN), which protect cryo-magnets from neutral particle debris from the interaction region.

The two detectors have a common structure of two independent calorimeter towers, for photon and neutron measurements. The towers are made from tungsten absorber layers and scintillator layers, with a difference in the size of transverse sections for the two arms. The calorimeter towers are used to measure incoming particle energy and to identify families of particles. Each detector has a tracking system: the Arm 1 system consists of four double-layers os scintillating fibres; Arm 2 consists of microstrip silicon layers. The energy resolution for the detectors is over 3% for photons above 100 GeV and around 40% for neutrons. The position resolution for Arm 1 and Arm 2 is 200 μm and 40 μm for photons respectively, and is around 1 mm for neutrons for both the detectors.

== Results ==
The first phase of data using the LHCf detectors was recorded in 2009–2013, as part of the LHC's Run 1. The LHCf results at 7 TeV centre-of-mass energy showed good agreement with theoretical models for forward photon and neutral pion production. However, the results did not agree for the forward neutron production.

LHCf was able to measure how the number of forward photons and neutrons varies with energy at new high energies. The results of the experiment agree with some theoretical models but disagree with other.

The current focus of the LHCf is to look out for neutral kaons and neutral eta mesons, particles that include a strange quark. The theoretical models describing this interaction predict secondary muons, but the predicted numbers disagree with experimental data. The LHCf experiment hopes to resolve the "muon puzzle".
