= FASER experiment =

Particle physics experiment

Coordinates: 46°14′09″N 6°03′18″E

Large Hadron Collider (LHC)
- Plan of the LHC experiments and the preaccelerators

LHC experiments
- ATLAS: A Toroidal LHC Apparatus
- CMS: Compact Muon Solenoid
- LHCb: LHC-beauty
- ALICE: A Large Ion Collider Experiment
- TOTEM: Total Cross Section, Elastic Scattering and Diffraction Dissociation
- LHCf: LHC-forward
- MoEDAL: Monopole and Exotics Detector At the LHC
- FASER: ForwArd Search ExpeRiment
- SND: Scattering and Neutrino Detector

LHC preaccelerators
- p and Pb: Linear accelerators for protons (Linac 4) and lead (Linac 3)
- (not marked): Proton Synchrotron Booster
- PS: Proton Synchrotron
- SPS: Super Proton Synchrotron

FASER (ForwArd Search ExpeRiment) is one of the nine particle physics experiments in 2022 at the Large Hadron Collider at CERN. It is designed to both search for new elementary particles, as well as to detect and study the interactions of high-energy collider neutrinos. In March 2023, FASER reported the first observation of collider neutrinos, which was confirmed shortly after also by SND@LHC.

The experiment is installed in the service tunnel TI12, which is 480 m downstream from the interaction point used by the ATLAS experiment. This tunnel was formerly used to inject the beam from the SPS into the LEP accelerator. In this location, the FASER experiment is placed into an intense and highly collimated beam of both neutrinos as well as possible new particles. Additionally, it is shielded from ATLAS by about 100 meters of rock and concrete, providing a low background environment. The FASER experiment was approved in 2019. The detector was built in the following two years and installed in 2021. The experiment started taking data at the beginning of Run 3 of the LHC in summer 2022.

== Searches for new elementary particles ==
The primary goal of the FASER experiment is to search for new light and feebly interacting elementary particles, that have not been discovered yet, such as dark photons, axion-like particles and sterile neutrinos. If these particles are sufficiently light, they can be produced in rare decays of hadrons. Such particles will therefore be dominantly produced in the forward direction along the collision axis, forming a highly collimated beam, and can inherit a large fraction of the LHC proton beam energy. Additionally, due to their small couplings to the standard model particles and large boosts, these particles are long-lived and can easily travel hundreds of meters without interacting before they decay to standard model particles. These decays lead to a spectacular signal, the appearance of highly energetic particles, which FASER aims to detect.

The FASER Collaboration has performed several searches for new elementary particles:

- In March 2023, FASER reported their first results on the search for dark photons decaying to a highly energetic electron-position pair. No signal consistent with a dark photon was seen in their 2022 data and limits on previously unconstrained parameter space were set.
- In March 2024, FASER reported their first results on a search for axion-like particles decaying to highly energetic photons. No signal consistent with such particles was seen in their data collected in 2022/2023 and limits on previously unconstrained parameter space were set.

== Neutrino physics ==
Position of FASER experiment in side tunnel TI12 in the LHC at CERN

The LHC is the highest energy particle collider built so far, and therefore also the source of the most energetic neutrinos created in a controlled laboratory environment. Indeed, collisions at the LHC lead to a large flux of high-energy neutrinos of all flavours, which are highly collimated around the beam collision axis and stream through the FASER location.

In 2021, the FASER Collaboration announced the first detection of collider neutrino candidates. The data used for this discovery was collected by a small emulsion pilot detector with a target mass of 11 kg. The detector was placed in the service tunnel TI18, and the data was collected for only four weeks during LHC Run 2 in 2018. While this outcome fell short of being a discovery of collider neutrinos, it highlighted the potential and feasibility of conducting dedicated neutrino experiments at the LHC.

In 2023, the FASER Collaboration announced and published the first observation of collider neutrinos. For this, they searched for events in which a high momentum track emerges from the central part of the FASERv detector volume and no activity in the most upstream veto layers, as expected from a muon neutrino interaction. This search was performed using only the electronic detector components.

To study these neutrino interactions in greater detail, FASER also contains the dedicated FASERv sub-detector (which is pronounced FASERnu). This detector consists of over 700 photographic emulsion films interleaved with 1mm thick plates of tungsten. This detector, which has a mass of about 1.1 tons, has the ability to observe the particles emerging from a neutrino interaction with sub-μm resultion, thereby providing a very high resolution image of neutrino interactions. During its nominal run time of a few years, about 10000 neutrinos are expected to be recorded by FASERν. These neutrinos typically have TeV scale energies, allowing FASERv to study their interactions in a regime where they are currently unconstrained.

The FASER Collaboration has performed several measurements of neutrinos:

- In March 2023, the first observation of muon neutrinos and muon anti-neutrinos at the LHC was reported, using FASER's electronic detector components.
- In March 2024, the first observation of electron neutrinos at the LHC, as well as the first measurement of the electron and muon neutrino cross section at TeV energies, was reported. This measurement was performed by the FASERv emulsion detector.
- In December 2024, first measurement of the energy spectum of LHC neutrinos performed, using FASER's electronic detector components.

FASER experiment setup in the LHC at CERN

FASER's neutrino program is capable of exploring the following physics domains:

1. FASER measures neutrino-nucleus interaction cross sections for all three neutrino flavours at the TeV energy scale. With the ability to identify the neutrino flavor, this allows to test lepton flavour universality in neutrino scattering.
2. FASER will be able to see the highest number of tau neutrino interactions, allowing to study this elusive particle in greater detail.
3. FASER will carry out very precise measurements of muon neutrino interactions at an energy scale never explored before. These measurements will allow to probe the proton's structure and constrain parton distribution functions.
4. Neutrinos reaching FASER are primarily produced in the decay of pions, kaons and charmed hadrons. The measurement of the neutrino fluxes therefore allows to constrain the production of these particles in kinematic regime that is inaccessible for the other LHC experiments. This provides new key inputs for astro-particle physics experiments.

== Detector ==
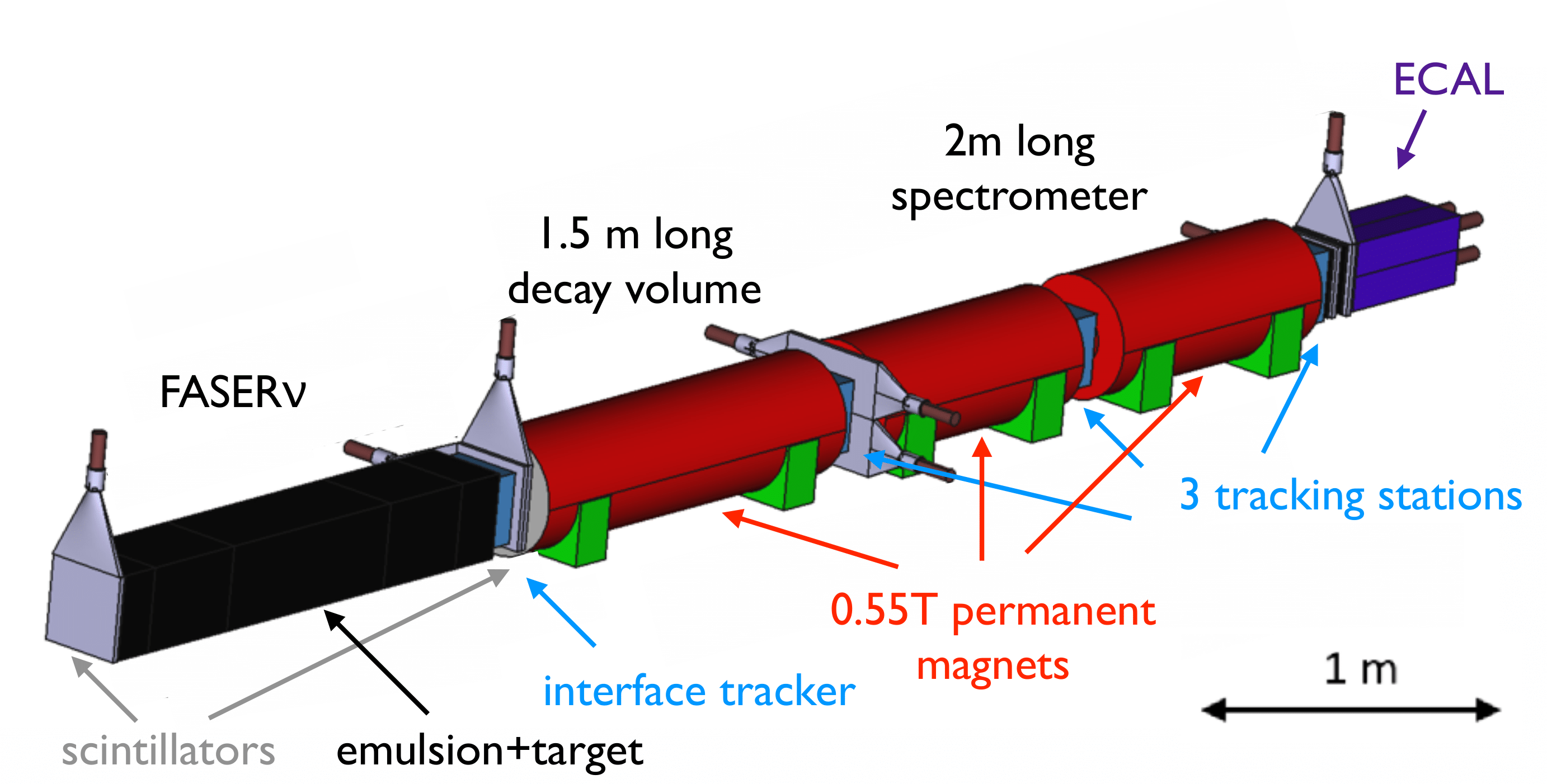
Layout of the FASER detector

The FASER detector is located in the service tunnel TI12, about 480 meters east of the ATLAS experiment. At this location, a concrete trench has been excavated to align the detector precisely with the beam axis, where the flux of neutrinos is maximized. The detector covers the pseudorapidity region η > 8.5.

Located at the front end of FASER is the FASERν neutrino detector. It consists of over 700 layers of emulsion films interleaved with tungsten plates acting as target material for neutrino interactions. This setup allows to see charged particle tracks and electromagnetic showers emerging from the neutrino interaction, measure their momenta and energies, as well as identify short-lived charm hadron or tau lepton decays. Together, this enables a precise reconstruction of neutrino interactions. On its upstream end, a front veto consisting of two scintillators layers detects incoming charged particles, while downstream, an interface tracker connects the emulsion detector with the electronic components of the FASER main detector.

Behind FASERν and at the entrance to the main detector is a charged particle veto consisting of plastic. This is followed by a 1.5 meter long empty decay volume and a 2 meter long tracking spectrometer, both of which are placed in a 0.57 T magnetic field. The spectrometer consists of three tracking stations, composed of layers of precision silicon strip detectors, to detect charged particles produced in the decay of long-lived particles. Further downstream, the pre-shower station provides particle identification capabilities while the electromagnetic calorimeter, composed of four spare modules from the LHCb experiment, measures the energy of electromagnetic showers.

In January 2025, a new high granularity preshower system was installed. This allows the separation of two very closely spaced high energy photons, as expected from axion-like particle decay. Furthermore, a muon identification system was installed at the end of the detector. Both upgrades enhance the capability of searches for new elementary particles.

The FASER location has also been used to host prototypes for proposed future detectors. In 2024, the FORMOSA demonstrator was installed behind FASER. This detector is designed similar to the MilliQan experiment and consists of an array of highly sensitive plastic scintillators. Like MilliQan, it searches for millicharged particles, which are possible elementary particles whose charge is much smaller than that of an electron. The demonstrator aims to prove the feasibility of the full experiment, which is intended to be installed in the proposed Forward Physics Facility, an underground hall located about 620 metres away from the ATLAS interaction point. The FORMOSA demonstrator took data in 2024 and 2025.

In January 2026, the FORMOSA demonstrator was removed and replaced by two new prototype detectors installed downstream of FASER. One of these, FASERCal, uses a three-dimensional array of plastic scintillator cubes read out by optical fibers, similar to the Super Fine-Grained Detector (SuperFGD) of the T2K experiment. The second detector is the analog hadron calorimeter (AHCAL). The prototype was originally built for test-beam studies conducted in 2022–2023 in preparation for the proposed Circular Electron–Positron Collider (CEPC). It consists of 40 alternating layers of steel absorber plates and scintillator tiles coupled to silicon photomultipliers. This layered design provides fine spatial resolution and detailed imaging of hadronic particle showers, making it also well suited for neutrino detection.
