= Jasper Kirkby =

British experimental particle physicist

Jasper Kirkby is a British experimental particle physicist working at CERN. He is known for his pioneering idea of Tau-Charm Factory, an accelerator for the BEPC II in Beijing. He has led large particle accelerator experiments at SPEAR and the Paul Scherrer Institute. He completed his degrees in Oxford and London, then spent twelve years at Stanford University before joining CERN in 1984. Since 2013, he's been a professor at Goethe-Universität Frankfurt am Main.

== Early life and education ==
Jasper Kirkby was born in 1948 in Prestwich, United Kingdom. In 1969, he received a M.A. degree in physics from Oriel College in Oxford, United Kingdom. In 1972, he received a Ph.D. degree in high energy physics from Westfield College in London, United Kingdom.

== CLOUD experiment ==
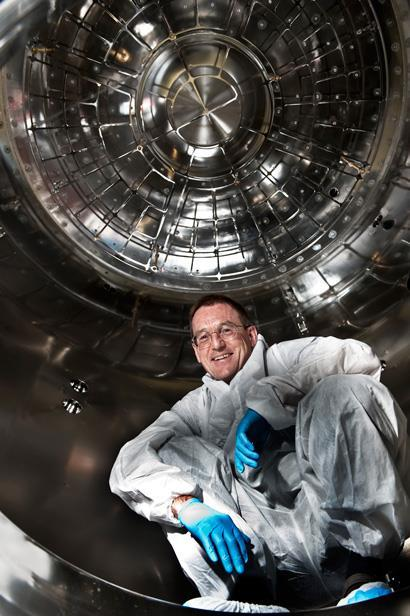
Jasper Kirkby - CLOUD Experiment

The CLOUD experiment involves investigating possible physical mechanisms for solar/cosmic ray forcing - a theory whereby cloud nucleation is affected by cosmic rays and the cosmic rays are affected by solar activity. The main purpose of the CLOUD experiment is to simulate the conditions under which clouds form in Earth's atmosphere—specifically, the process by which cloud condensation nuclei form from aerosols in the atmosphere.

Kirkby et al. published the results of CLOUD's first experiment in the journal Nature in 2011, reporting that cosmic rays "seemed to enhance the production of nanometer-sized particles from the gaseous atmosphere by more than a factor of ten." He added, however, that the particles in question are far too small to serve as cloud condensation nuclei, adding, "At the moment, it actually says nothing about a possible cosmic-ray effect on clouds and climate, but it's a very important first step."

== Awards ==
- Benjamin Y.H. Liu Award of The American Association for Aerosol Research (2019)
