= Brigitte Vachon =

Canadian physicist

Brigitte Marie Christine Vachon is a Canadian experimental particle physicist, who works at McGill University as James McGill Professor of Physics. Her research involves the design and development of experimental detectors in high-energy physics collaborations including the ATLAS experiment and OPAL experiment at the Large Hadron Collider, the DØ experiment at Fermilab, and SNOLAB, a Canadian underground neutrino and dark matter laboratory.

== Education and career ==
After growing up in Sainte-Marie de Beauce, a town in Quebec, Vachon graduated from McGill University in 1997. She completed a Ph.D. in 2002 at the University of Victoria, under the joint supervision of Robert A. McPherson and Randall J. Sobie.

After postdoctoral research at Fermilab, supported by a Lederman fellowship, she returned to McGill in 2004 as a faculty member, supported by a tier 2 Canada Research Chair. She was given the James McGill Professorship in 2022.

In 2014, she founded the annual Canadian Conference for Undergraduate Women in Physics.

== Recognition ==
Vachon's doctoral dissertation received the Governor General's Academic Medal. The McGill Department of Physics gave her their 2023–2024 John David Jackson Award for Excellence in Teaching.

In 2024, Vachon was elected to the Royal Society of Canada, for her "groundbreaking investigations of particle collisions at the high energy frontier" and "innovative contributions to the development and application of novel instruments".
