= ALEPH experiment =

Large Electron-Positron Collider experiments
- ALEPH: Apparatus for LEP PHysics
- DELPHI: DEtector with Lepton, Photon and Hadron Identification
- OPAL: Omni-Purpose Apparatus for LEP
- L3: Third LEP experiment

ALEPH was a particle detector at the Large Electron-Positron collider (LEP) at CERN. It was designed to explore the physics predicted by the Standard Model and to search for physics beyond it.

== Detector ==
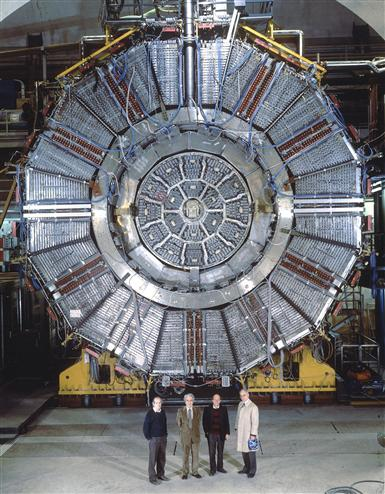
The ALEPH detector had a time projection chamber at its core for detecting the direction and momenta of charged particles with extreme accuracy. In the foreground from the left, Jacques Lefrancois, Jack Steinberger, Lorenzo Foa and Pierre Lazeyras. ALEPH was an experiment on the LEP accelerator, which studied high-energy collisions between electrons and positrons (1989–2000)

The ALEPH detector was built to measure events created by electron positron collisions in LEP. It operated from 1989 to 1995 in the energy range of the Z particle (around 91 GeV) and later (1995 to 2000) above the threshold of W pair production (up to 200 GeV). Typical events have many particles distributed in jets over the entire detector volume. The event rate ranged from around 1 Hz at the peak of the Z to at least a factor hundred smaller at the highest energies. The ALEPH detector was therefore designed to accumulate, for each event, as much information over as much solid angle as was practical.

This was achieved by a cylindrical arrangement around the beam pipe with the electron-positron interaction point in the middle. A magnetic field of 1.5 tesla was created by a superconducting coil 6.4 m long and 5.3 m in diameter. The iron return yoke was a dodecagonal cylinder with two end-plates that left holes for a focusing magnet (quadrupole) of the LEP machine. The iron was 1.2 m thick and was subdivided into layers that left space for the insertion of layers of streamer tubes. In this way the iron yoke was a fully instrumented hadron calorimeter (HCAL), which was read out in 4608 projective towers. Outside the iron, there were two double layers of streamer tube chambers to record the position and angle of muons that had penetrated the iron.

Inside the coil was the electron-photon calorimeter (ECAL), designed for the highest possible angular resolution and electron identification. It consisted of alternating layers of lead and proportional tubes read out in 73,728 projective towers, each subdivided into three depth zones. The central detector for charged particles was the time projection chamber (TPC), 4.4 m long and 3.6 m in diameter. It provided a three dimensional measurement of each track segment. In addition, it provided up to 330 ionisation measurements for a track; this was useful for particle identification. The TPC surrounded the inner track chamber (ITC); an axial-wire drift chamber with inner and outer diameters of 13 cm and 29 cm and a length of 2 m. It provided 8 track coordinates and a trigger signal for charged particles that came from the interaction point. Closest to the beam pipe, was a silicon strip vertex detector. For each track, this measured two pairs of coordinates, 6.3 cm and 11 cm away from the beam axis over a length of 40 cm along the beam line. The beam pipe, made out of beryllium, had a diameter of 16 cm. The vacuum inside was about 10^{−15} atm.
