= BINP =

BINP may refer to:

- Budker Institute of Nuclear Physics in Russia
- Bwindi Impenetrable National Park in Uganda
