= Super Charm-Tau factory =

Future electron–positron collider in Novosibirsk, Russia

General properties
- Accelerator type: Synchrotron
- Beam type: Electrons, Positrons
- Target type: Collider

Beam properties
- Maximum energy: 2–6 GeV
- Maximum current: 2.2 A
- Maximum luminosity: 2×10^{35} cm^{−2}·s^{−1}

Physical properties
- Circumference: 478 m
- Location: Novosibirsk, Russia
- Institution: Budker Institute of Nuclear Physics
- Dates of operation: unknown
- Preceded by: VEPP-5

Super Charm-Tau factory (SCT) is an electron–positron collider being designed and built by Budker Institute of Nuclear Physics in Novosibirsk. Its main goal is to study the CP-violation in the processes involving charmed hadrons, to investigate decays of the τ-lepton as well as to search for new forms of matter: glueballs, dark matter, etc.

In the SCT the center of mass energy of colliding electrons and positrons will be 2–6 GeV while the luminosity will reach as high as 2×10^{35} cm^{−2}·s^{−1}. The electrons will be partially polarized. The synchrotron will be operating for 10 years. The particle registration and measurements will done using a universal high performance magnetic detector with the field strength of 1–1.5 tesla.

The SCT project is one Megascience class projects being built in Russia.

== See also ==
- Beijing Electron–Positron Collider II
- Belle II
- PANDA experiment
