= VEPP-5 =

Russian particle accelerator

VEPP-5 or Colliding Electron-Positron Beams-5 (Russian: встречный электронный позитронный пучки-5 or Russian: ВЭПП-5) is a particle accelerator at Budker Institute of Nuclear Physics (BINP) in Novosibirsk, Russia. Its injector started operating in 2015.

== Description ==
VEPP-5 consists of an injection complex, channels for transportation of particle beams, VEPP-2000, synchrotron radiation stations of the VEPP-4M (electron-positron collider).

== See also ==
- VEPP-2000
- SND Experiment
