= Tracking (particle physics) =

Reconstructing the trajectories of charged particles in a particle accelerator

In particle physics, tracking is the process of reconstructing the trajectory (or track) of electrically charged particles in a particle detector known as a tracker. The particles entering such a tracker leave a precise record of their passage through the device, by interaction with suitably constructed components and materials. The presence of a calibrated magnetic field, in all or part of the tracker, allows the local momentum of the charged particle to be directly determined from the reconstructed local curvature of the trajectory for known (or assumed) electric charge of the particle.

Generally, track reconstruction is divided into two stages. First, track finding needs to be performed where a cluster of detector hits believed to originate from the same track are grouped together. Second, a track fitting is performed. Track fitting is the procedure of mathematically fitting a curve to the found hits and from this fit the momentum is obtained.

Identification and reconstruction of trajectories from the digitised output of a modern tracker can, in the simplest cases, in the absence of a magnetic field and absorbing/scattering material, be achieved via straight-line segment fits. A simple helical model, to determine momentum in the presence of a magnetic field, might be sufficient in less simple cases, through to a complete (e.g.) Kalman Filter process, to provide a detailed reconstructed local model throughout the complete track in the most complex cases.

This reconstruction of trajectory plus momentum allows projection to/through other detectors, which measure other important properties of the particle such as energy or particle type (Calorimeter, Cherenkov Detector). These reconstructed charged particles can be used to identify and reconstruct secondary decays, including those arising from 'unseen' neutral particles, as can be done for B-tagging (in experiments like CDF or at the LHC) and to fully reconstruct events (as in many current particle physics experiments, such as ATLAS, BaBar, Belle and CMS).

In particle physics there have been many devices used for tracking. These include cloud chambers (1920–1950), nuclear emulsion plates (1937–), bubble chambers (1952–), spark chambers (1954-), multi wire proportional chambers (1968–) and drift chambers (1971–), including time projection chambers (1974–). With the advent of semiconductors plus modern photolithography, solid state trackers, also called silicon trackers (1980–), are used in experiments requiring compact, high-precision, fast-readout tracking; for example, close to the primary interaction point in a collider like the LHC.

== Principles of Track Reconstruction ==
Tracking is based on the interaction of charged particles with a detector material. As particles traverse a magnetic field, they follow curved paths due to the Lorentz force. The key steps in track reconstruction include:

Hit Detection – Charged particles ionize the detector material, leaving measurable signals (hits) in tracking detectors such as silicon sensors or drift chambers.

Clustering and Spacepoint Formation – Nearby hits are grouped together to enhance signal detection and suppress noise.

Track Seeding – Initial track candidates are identified using a small number of hits, often employing pattern recognition techniques.

Track Finding – Additional hits along a trajectory are associated with seeded tracks to extend and refine track candidates.

Track Fitting – A mathematical model is applied to determine the optimal trajectory that best describes the detected hits while accounting for measurement uncertainties and material interactions.

Ambiguity Resolution – Multiple candidate tracks are compared, and the most likely trajectories are selected.

Vertex Reconstruction – Tracks are extrapolated to identify the points where they originate, allowing for the reconstruction of interaction vertices.

== Tracking Detectors ==
Various types of detectors are used for tracking in modern high-energy physics experiments:

Silicon Pixel and Strip Detectors – Provide precise spatial resolution and are commonly used in the inner tracking layers of experiments like ATLAS and CMS.

Drift Chambers – Detect ionization electrons drifting in a gas-filled chamber, used in older and large-scale tracking systems.

Time Projection Chambers (TPCs) – Measure track positions based on the drift time of ionization electrons in a uniform electric field.

Scintillating Fiber Trackers – Utilize scintillating fibers coupled with photodetectors to record particle interactions.
