= ND experiment =

Nuclear physics experiments in Novosibirsk, Russia (1982–1987)

Neutral Detector (ND) is a detector for particle physics experiments created by the team of physicists in the Budker Institute of Nuclear Physics, Novosibirsk, Russia. Experiments with the ND were conducted from 1982 to 1987 at the e^{+}e^{−} storage ring VEPP-2M in the energy range 2E = 0.5 to 1.4 GeV.

== Physics ==
At the beginning of 80s the leading cross sections of the electron-positron annihilation in the final states with charged particles were measured in the energy range 2E=0.5-1.4 GeV. Processes with the neutral particles in the final state were less studied. To investigate the radiative decays of the $\rho^0$, $\omega$, and $\phi$ mesons and other processes involving photons, $\pi^0$, and $\eta$ mesons the ND was constructed. Its distinguishing features are defined by the specially designed electromagnetic calorimeter based on NaI(Tl) scintillation counters.

List of published analyses

- Radiative decays

$e^+e^- \to \rho, \omega, \phi \to \pi^0 \gamma, \eta \gamma$
$\phi \to \eta^\prime \gamma$

- Rare decays of the $\rho^0$, $\omega$, and $\phi$ mesons

$\omega, \phi \to \pi^0 e^+e^-$
$\phi \to \pi^+ \pi^-$

- Search for rare decays

$\rho \to \pi^+ \pi^- \pi^0$
$\omega, \phi \to \pi^0 \pi^0 \gamma$
$\phi \to \pi^0 \eta \gamma$
light scalars $a_0(980)$ and $f_0(975)$ in $\phi$-meson radiative decays

- Non-resonant electron-positron annihilation into hadrons

$e^+e^- \to \omega \pi^0$
$e^+e^- \to \pi^+ \pi^- \pi^0 ,~~ \pi^+ \pi^- \eta$
$e^+e^- \to \pi^+ \pi^- \pi^+ \pi^-,~~ \pi^+ \pi^- \pi^0 \pi^0$

- Test of QED processes

$$e^+e^- \to \gamma \gamma \gamma \gamma$$
$$e^+e^- \to e^+e^- \gamma \gamma$$
$$e^+e^- \to e^+e^- e^+e^-$$
$e^+e^- \to e^+e^- \gamma$ (virtual Compton scattering)

- Analyses of other processes
  - Measurement of the ω-meson parameters
  - Upper limits on electron width of scalar and tensor mesons $f_0(975)$, $f_2(1270)$, $f_0(1300)$, $a_0(980)$, and $a_2(1320)$
  - $\phi \to \pi^+ \pi^- \pi^0,~~ K^0_S K^0_L$
  - Search for
    - $e^+e^- \to \pi^0 \pi^0 \gamma$
    - $K^0_S \to \gamma \gamma$
    - $e^+e^- \to C(1480) \to \phi \pi^0$

== Detector ==
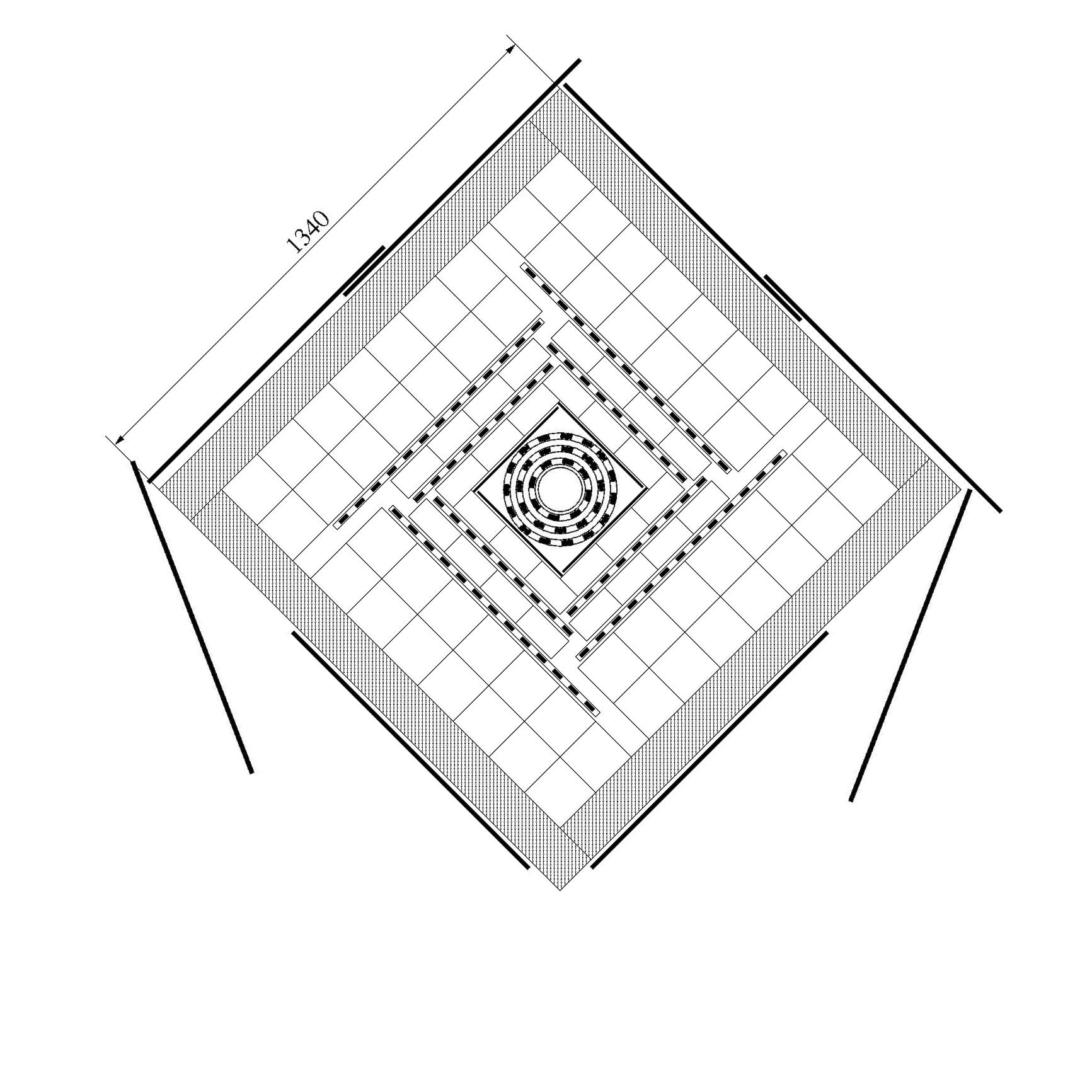
Neutral Detector r-φ view.

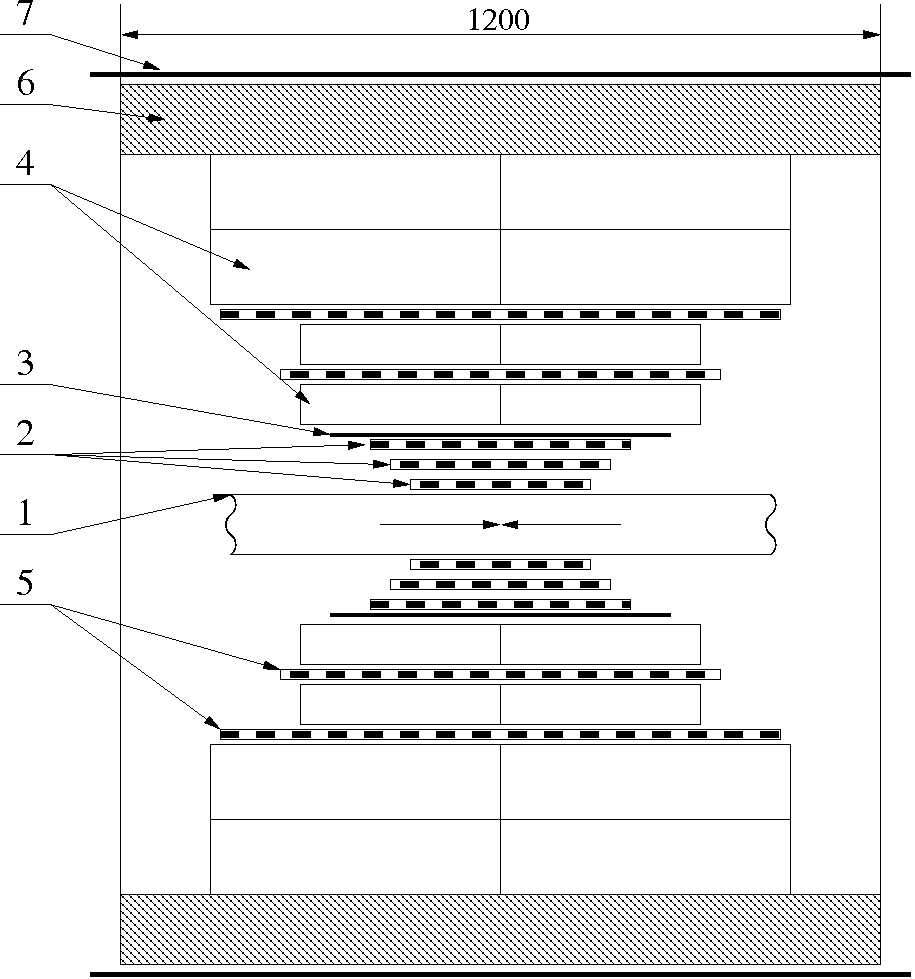
Neutral Detector r-θ view; 1-vacuum chamber of the storage ring, 2-cylindrical proportional chambers, 3-plastic scintillation counters, 4-NaI(Tl) counters, 5-flat proportional chambers, 6-iron absorber, 7-anticoincidence counters.

Based on goals of the physics program the ND consist of

Electromagnetic calorimeter

- 168 rectangular NaI(Tl) scintillation counters
- total mass of NaI(Tl) is 2.6 t
- solid angle coverage is 65% of 4π sr
- minimum thickness is 32 cm or 12 radiation length
- energy resolution for photons is σ/E = 4% / √E

Charged particle coordinate system

- 3 layers of coaxial cylindrical 2-d wire proportional chambers in the center of the detector
- solid angle coverage is 80% of 4π sr
- angular resolution is 0.5° in the azimuthal and 1.5° in the polar direction
- surrounded by the 5-mm thick plastic scintillation counter for trigger

Flat (shower) coordinate 2-d wire proportional chambers

- 2 layers of flat 2-d wire proportional chambers.
- angular resolution is 2° in the azimuthal and 3.5° in the polar direction for 0.5 GeV photons

Iron absorber & anti-coincidence counters

- The electromagnetic calorimeter is covered by the 10-cm thick iron absorber and plastic scintillation anti-coincidence counters.

== Results ==
Data collected with the ND experiment corresponds to the integrated luminosity 19 pb^{−1}. Results of the experiments with ND are presented in Ref., and are included in the PDG Review.

== See also ==
- Annihilation – Collision of a particle and its antiparticle
- Budker Institute of Nuclear Physics – Research institute in Novosibirsk, Russia
- Experimental physics – Category of disciplines and sub-disciplines in Physics
- List of accelerators in particle physics – List compiling of particle accelerators used for particle physics experiments
- List of particles – List of particles in matter including fermions and bosons
- Meson – Subatomic particle; made of equal numbers of quarks and antiquarks
- Particle detector – Device used to detect, track, and/or identify ionising particles
- SND Experiment – Detector for particle physics experiments
- Storage ring – Type of particle accelerator
