= Detection of internally reflected Cherenkov light =

In particle detectors a detection of internally reflected Cherenkov light (DIRC) detector measures the velocity of charged particles and is used for particle identification. It is a design of a ring imaging Cherenkov detector where Cherenkov light that is contained by total internal reflection inside the solid radiator has its angular information preserved until it reaches the light sensors at the detector perimeter.

The Cherenkov light is following a zigzag path between parallel surfaces. The light detectors would be positioned to the right.

A charged particle travelling through a material (for instance fused silica) with a speed greater than c/n (n refractive index, c vacuum speed of light) emits Cherenkov radiation. If the light angle on the surface is sufficiently shallow, this radiation is contained inside and transmitted through internal reflections to an expansion volume, coupled to photomultipliers (or other types of photon detectors), to measure the angle. Preserving the angle requires a precise planar and rectangular cross section of the radiator. Knowledge of the angle at which the radiation was produced, combined with the track angle and the particle's momentum (measured in a tracking detector like a drift chamber) may be used to calculate the particle's mass.

A DIRC was first proposed by Blair Ratcliff as a tool for particle identification at a B-Factory, and the design was first used by the BaBar collaboration at SLAC. Since the successful operation in the BaBar experiment next-generation DIRC-type detectors have been designed for several new particle physics experiments, including Belle-II, PANDA, and GlueX. The DIRC differs from earlier RICH and CRID Cherenkov light detectors in that the quartz bars used as radiators also transmit the light.

== See also ==
- BaBar DIRC homepage
- Ratcliff, B (2003). "Imaging rings in Ring Imaging Cherenkov counters" (PDF). Nuclear Instruments and Methods in Physics Research A. 502 (1): 211–221. Bibcode:2003NIMPA.502..211R. doi:10.1016/S0168-9002(03)00276-6. OSTI 808694.
- C Lu; D Marlow; C Mindas (1996). "Detection of internally reflected Cherenkov light, results from the BELLE DIRC prototype". Proceedings of the Second International Workshop on Ring Imaging Cherenkov Detectors. 371 (1–2): 82–86. Bibcode:1996NIMPA.371...82L. doi:10.1016/0168-9002(95)01256-7.
- P. Coyle; H. Kawahara; A. Lu (1994). "The DIRC counter: a new type of particle identification device for B factories". Nuclear Instruments and Methods in Physics Research Section A: Accelerators, Spectrometers, Detectors and Associated Equipment. 343 (1): 292–299. Bibcode:1994NIMPA.343..292C. doi:10.1016/0168-9002(94)90568-1.
- H. Salazar; E. Moreno; T. Murrieta (2006). "Detection of Cherenkov Photons with Multi-Anode Photomultipliers". AIP Conference Proceedings. 857: 113–120. Bibcode:2006AIPC..857..113S. doi:10.1063/1.2359247. S2CID 54665079.
