= Cherenkov detector =

Particle detector for Cherenkov radiation

A Cherenkov detector (pronunciation: /tʃɛrɛnˈkɔv/; Russian: Черенко́в) is a type of particle detector designed to detect and identify particles by produced Cherenkov radiation. Many high energy diagnostic techniques leverage Cherenkov radiation because of its relatively unique properties compared to other forms of radiation emission. Cherenkov detectors are used in nuclear physics, cosmic ray physics, particle physics and inertial confinement fusion. Jelley notes the following advantages

- Fast counting, short response times and high count rates can be achieved
- Direct determination of velocity, if mass is known
- Energy discrimination
- Charge determination, as Cherenkov radiation goes as the charge squared, $q^2$
- Counting over large areas, particularly in cosmic ray fields, where many meter sized detectors are reasonable
- Direction selection

and notes that it typically cannot be used for low energy (<175 keV) particles, it has generally weak light emission, typically requiring amplification through photomultiplier tubes or other techniques.

Chereknov detectors are contrasted with other nuclear particle measurement techniques such as scintillation counters or semiconductor detectors.

== Fundamental properties ==
Cherenkov radiation is produced when a charged particle transmits through a material at a velocity greater than that at which light can travel through the material. This is analogous to the production of a sonic boom when an airplane is traveling through the air faster than sound waves can move through the air. To create Cherenkov light, the charged particle must have a high enough velocity and therefore energy to meet the condition

$v> \frac{c}{n}$ or $\beta > \frac{1}{n}$

where $v$, is the velocity of the particle, is greater than $c$, the speed of light in a vacuum divided by $n$, the refractive index of the medium, or equivalently the with relativistic beta, $\beta= \frac{v}{c}$. The threshold condition can also be expressed in terms of the charge particle's energy through the Frank–Tamm formula as

$E_{\text{th}} = \bigg( \frac{1}{\sqrt{1-\frac{1}{n^2}}} - 1 \bigg) m c^2$.

Thereby the incident particle must have above a specific energy in order create any Cherenkov radiation. This energy and velocity threshold relation is used as particle identification as a binary yes/no detection if any Cherenkov light is produced. The direction this light is emitted is on a cone about the direction the particle is moving, with the Cherenkov angle, $\theta_c$, having the relation

$\cos(\theta_c) = \frac{c}{n v} = \frac{1}{n \beta}$.

If the angle is measured, the particle velocity can be determined, with the resolution typically limited by chromatic error. The wavelength dependence from Cherenkov light is continuous and follows the Frank-Tamm formula

$\frac{d N_{\text{Cherenkov}}}{d \lambda} \approx \frac{ 2 \pi \alpha}{\lambda^2} \bigg(1 - \frac{1}{\beta^2 n(\lambda)^2} \bigg) (\Delta x)$.

Where the number of Cherenkov photons, $N_{\text{Cherenkov}}$, depends on constants like the fine structure constant, $\alpha$, and some path length $\Delta x$. Crucially, the frequency of Cherenkov photons follows a $N_{\text{Cherenkov}} \propto \frac{1}{\lambda^2}$ wavelength dependence, which is unique compared to other types of emitted radiation like bremsstrahlung, line-emission or scintillators. When one integrates this equation, the integration limits follow only to when the Cherenkov velocity conditions is met. With dispersion in materials, this typically only goes up to a peak wavelength of ~200 nm, depending on the index of refraction dependence. Because of this, Cherenkov radiation is typically brightest in the UV/visible bands, 200 nm to 400 nm, which, for human eyes, gives its characteristic blue hue. However, Cherenkov radiation emits in any frequency range where the condition is met, i.e down to the radiofrequency range.

Furthermore, the Cherenkov production method is extremely fast, to first order the transit time of a near-speed of light particle passing through a length through the material. Detailed calculations estimate Cherenkov pulses to vary ~1 to 100 femtoseconds, depending on details, and under specific conditions can be attosecond or shorter. In detectors, the temporal resolution of a Cherenkov detector depends more on the dispersion of the pulse or the speed of the amplification technique like a photomultipler.

Other notable properties include that Cherenkov light is coherent and polarized.

Most Cherenkov detectors aim at recording the Cherenkov light produced by a primary charged particle. Some sensor technologies explicitly aim at Cherenkov light produced (also) by secondary particles, be it incoherent emission as occurring in an electromagnetic particle shower or by coherent emission, for example Askaryan effect.

== Detector types ==
Cherenkov detectors can be classified as threshold or imaging detectors (including differential or ring imaging), they can be classified by the Cherenkov medium type - gas, aerogel, liquids, solids, metamaterials. They can be single photon collection or current mode. they can be classified on the photon collection type - gas, vacuum or solid state.

Jelley classifies Cherenkov detectors as focusing, where an optical system focuses the light, or a non-focusing, where the light is collected diffuse.

Cherenkov threshold detectors have been used for fast timing and time of flight measurements in particle detectors.

More elaborate designs use the amount of light produced. Recording light from both primary and secondary particles, for a Cherenkov calorimeter the total light yield is proportional to the incident particle energy.

== Examples ==
=== Particle physics ===
==== Rich in LHCb at CERN ====
The LHCb experiment at CERN employs the RICH detector. As a charged particle travels through the medium of the detector (C4F10 for RICH-1 and CF4 for RICH-4) it emits Cherenkov radiation in a ring pattern. Photon detectors are then used to detect the Cherenkov photons and by measuring the angle at which the Cherenkov photons are produced the velocity of the particle is determined. This can then be used along with information obtained from other parts of the detector (e.g. momentum and charge of the particle) to identify the particle type.

=== Cosmic ray physics ===
==== Super-Kamiokande ====
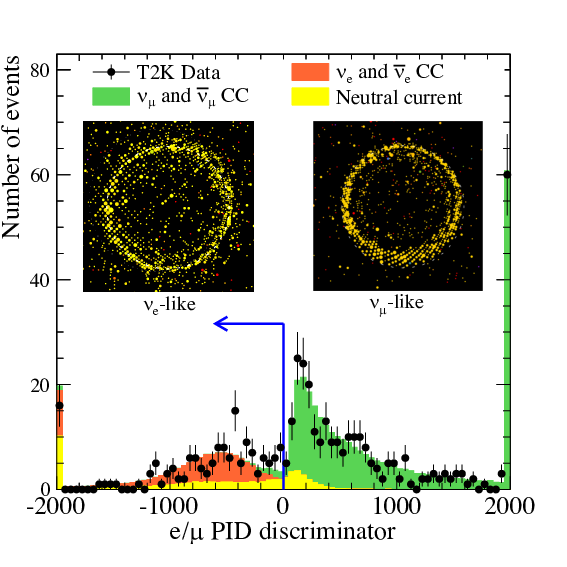
Plot showing examples of the Cherenkov rings measured by the Super-Kamiokande experiment. The ring of the left is fuzzy as it is produced by an electron while the ring on the right is much cleaner meaning it has been produced by a muon.

The Super-Kamiokande detector in Japan is Cherenkov detector used to detect neutrinos. It consists of 50,220 tonnes of ultrapure water which is used as the medium. As neutrinos pass through the water they have a small chance to interact with the electrons or nuclei in the water, producing either an electron or a muon. These are highly energetic and produce a cone of Cherenkov radiation as they travel through the water. The Cherenkov light is detected as a circular feature by the photomultiplier tubes placed around the detector and it is possible to distinguish between muons and electrons by the fuzziness of the rings. Muons are weakly interacting particles and can travel through the detector un-impeded, producing sharp rings, while electrons will scatter in the water producing rings that are much more fuzzy.

=== Inertial Confinement Fusion ===
Gas Cherenkov detectors are used to measure fast gamma-ray pulses from inertially confined nuclear fusion experiments, such as at the OMEGA Laser and the National Ignition Facility. Gamma-ray photons pass through a beryllium window where they are converted to relativistic electrons via Compton scattering, which generate Cherenkov radiation as they pass through a chamber of pressurized carbon dioxide. While these Cherenkov detectors lack imaging or spectral resolution, they have very fast temporal resolution. This makes them useful for measuring the time evolution of the fusion pulses, which can be shorter than 100 picoseconds.

== See also ==
- Ring imaging Cherenkov (RICH) detector
- Detection of internally reflected Cherenkov light (DIRC) detector
- Super-Kamiokande
