= Particle detector =

Device used to detect, track, and/or identify ionising particles

In experimental and applied particle physics, nuclear physics, and nuclear engineering, a particle detector, also known as a radiation detector, is a device used to detect, track, and/or identify ionizing particles, such as those produced by nuclear decay, cosmic radiation, or reactions in a particle accelerator. Detectors can measure the particle energy and other attributes such as momentum, spin, charge, particle type, in addition to merely registering the presence of the particle.

== The operating of a nuclear radiation detector ==
The operating principle of a nuclear radiation detector can be summarized as follows:

The detector identifies high-energy particles or photons—such as alpha, beta, gamma radiation, or neutrons—through their interactions with the atoms of the detector material. These interactions generate a primary signal, which may involve ionization of gas, the creation of electron-hole pairs in semiconductors, or the emission of light in scintillating materials. The primary signal is then amplified and processed by electronic systems. Finally, the resulting electrical pulse is analyzed to determine characteristics of the radiation, such as its energy, count rate, or spectral distribution.

== Types ==
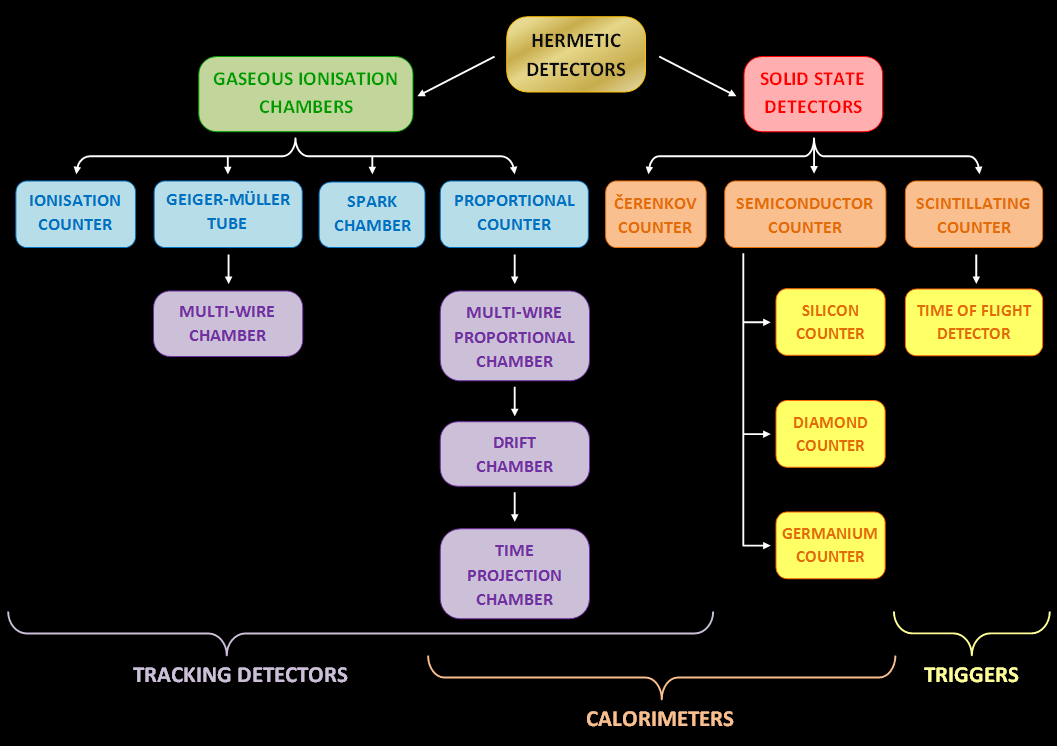
Summary of particle detector types

Many of the detectors invented and used so far are ionization detectors (of which gaseous ionization detectors and semiconductor detectors are most typical) and scintillation detectors; but other, completely different principles have also been applied, like Čerenkov light and transition radiation.

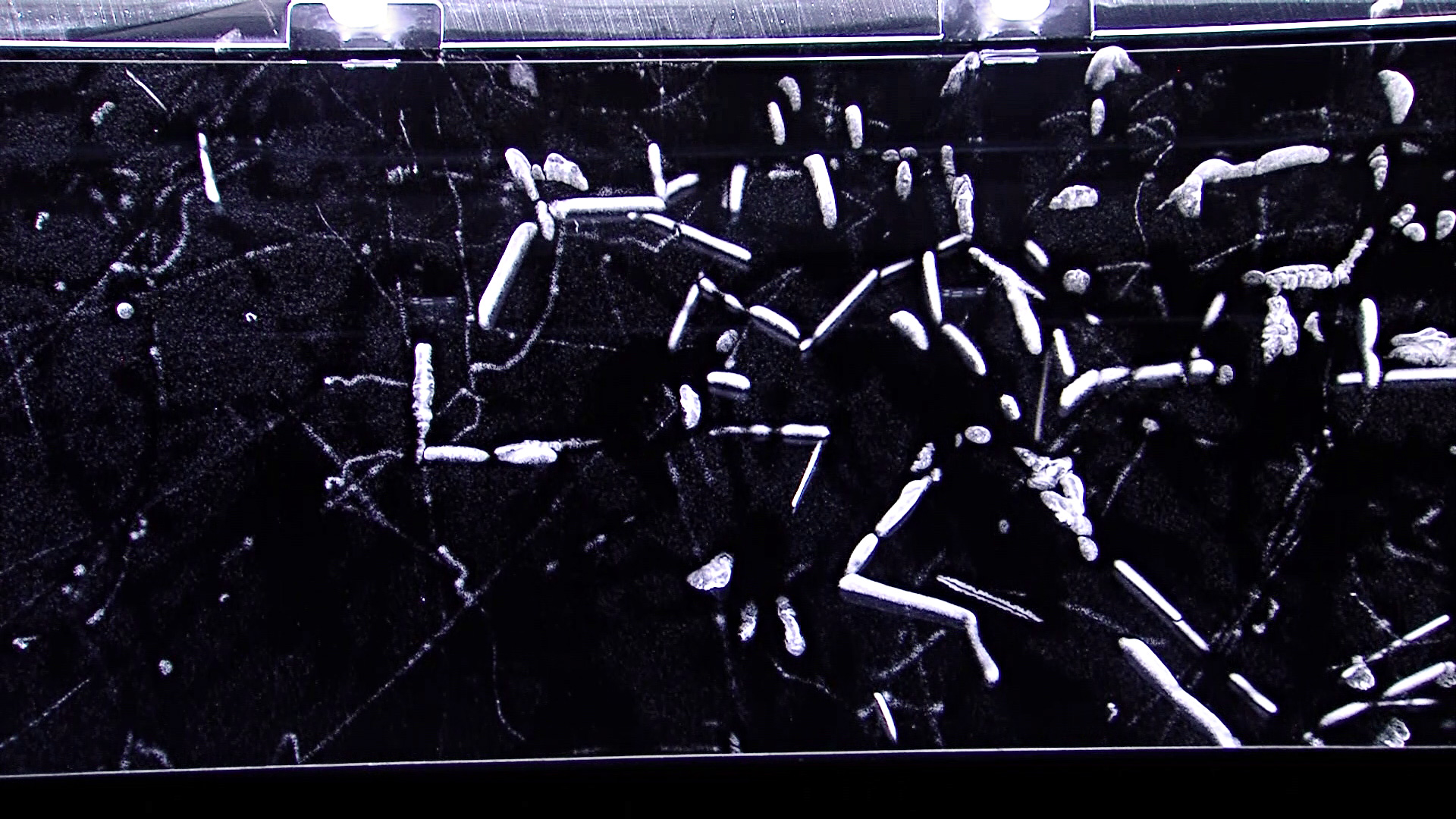
Cloud chambers visualize particles by creating a supersaturated layer of vapor. Particles passing through this region create cloud tracks similar to condensation trails of planes

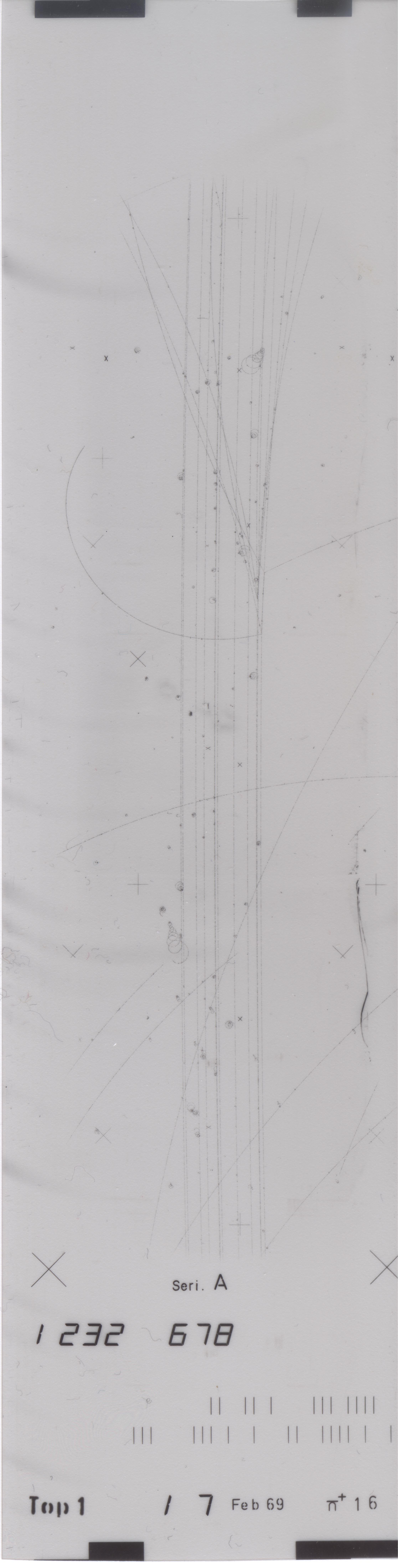
Recording of a bubble chamber at CERN

Historical examples

- Bubble chamber
- Wilson cloud chamber (diffusion chamber)
- Photographic plate (Nuclear emulsion)

Detectors for radiation protection

The following types of particle detector are widely used for radiation protection, and are commercially produced in large quantities for general use within the nuclear, medical, and environmental fields.

- Dosimeter
  - Electroscope (when used as a portable dosimeter)
- Gaseous ionization detector
  - Geiger counter
  - Ionization chamber
  - Proportional counter
- Solid-state detector
  - Scintillation counter
  - Semiconductor detector

Commonly used detectors for particle and nuclear physics

- Gaseous ionization detector
  - Ionization chamber
  - Proportional counter
    - Multiwire proportional chamber
    - Drift chamber
    - Time projection chamber
    - Micropattern gaseous detector
  - Geiger counter
  - Spark chamber
- Solid-state detector
  - Semiconductor detector and variants including CCDs
    - Silicon Vertex Detector
  - Solid-state nuclear track detector
  - Cherenkov detector
    - Ring-imaging Cherenkov detector (RICH)
  - Scintillation counter and associated photomultiplier, photodiode, or avalanche photodiode
    - Lucas cell
    - Time-of-flight detector
  - Transition radiation detector
- Calorimeter
- Microchannel plate detector
- Neutron detector

Modern detectors

Modern detectors in particle physics combine several of the above elements in layers much like an onion.

== Research particle detectors ==
Detectors designed for modern accelerators are huge, both in size and in cost. The term counter is often used instead of detector when the detector counts the particles but does not resolve its energy or ionization. Particle detectors can also usually track ionizing radiation (high energy photons or even visible light). If their main purpose is radiation measurement, they are called radiation detectors, but as photons are also particles, the term particle detector is still correct.

=== At colliders ===
- At CERN
  - for the LHC
    - CMS
    - ATLAS
    - ALICE
    - LHCb
  - for the LEP
    - Aleph
    - Delphi
    - L3
    - Opal
  - for the SPS
    - The COMPASS Experiment
    - Gargamelle
    - NA61/SHINE
- At Fermilab
  - for the Tevatron
    - CDF
    - D0
  - Mu2e
- At DESY
  - for HERA
    - H1
    - HERA-B
    - HERMES
    - ZEUS
- At BNL
  - for the RHIC
    - PHENIX
    - Phobos
    - STAR
- At SLAC
  - for the PeP-II
    - BaBar
  - for the SLC
    - SLD
- At Cornell
  - for CESR
    - CLEO
    - CUSB
- At BINP
  - for the VEPP-2M and VEPP-2000
    - ND
    - SND
    - CMD
  - for the VEPP-4
    - KEDR
- Others
  - MECO from UC Irvine

=== Under construction ===
- For International Linear Collider (ILC)
  - CALICE (Calorimeter for Linear Collider Experiment)

=== Without colliders ===
- Antarctic Muon And Neutrino Detector Array (AMANDA)
- Cryogenic Dark Matter Search (CDMS)
- Super-Kamiokande
- XENON

== On spacecraft ==
- Alpha Magnetic Spectrometer (AMS)
- DAMPE (DArk Matter Particle Explorer)
- Fermi Gamma-ray Space Telescope
- JEDI (Jupiter Energetic-particle Detector Instrument)

== Theoretical Models of Particle Detectors ==
Beyond their experimental implementations, theoretical models of particle detectors are also of great importance to theoretical physics. These models consider localized non-relativistic quantum systems coupled to a quantum field. They receive the name of particle detectors because when the non-relativistic quantum system is measured in an excited state, one can claim to have detected a particle. The first instance of particle detector models in the literature dates from the 80's, where a particle in a box was introduced by W. G. Unruh in order to probe a quantum field around a black hole. Shortly after, Bryce DeWitt proposed a simplification of the model, giving rise to the Unruh–DeWitt detector model.

Beyond their applications to theoretical physics, particle detector models are related to experimental fields such as quantum optics, where atoms can be used as detectors for the quantum electromagnetic field via the light–matter interaction. From a conceptual side, particle detectors also allow one to formally define the concept of particles without relying on asymptotic states, or representations of a quantum field theory. As M. Scully puts it, from an operational viewpoint one can state that "a particle is what a particle detector detects", which in essence defines a particle as the detection of excitations of a quantum field.

== See also ==
- Counting efficiency
- List of particles
- Tail-pulse generator
