= OPAL experiment =

Particle physics experiment at CERN

Large Electron-Positron Collider experiments
- ALEPH: Apparatus for LEP PHysics
- DELPHI: DEtector with Lepton, Photon and Hadron Identification
- OPAL: Omni-Purpose Apparatus for LEP
- L3: Third LEP experiment

OPAL was one of the major experiments at CERN's Large Electron–Positron Collider. OPAL studied particles and their interactions by collecting and analysing electron-positron collisions. There were over three-hundred physicists from 32 institutions involved in the collaboration.

LEP was the largest particle accelerator in the world. OPAL was one of four detectors associated with LEP, alongside ALEPH, DELPHI and L3.

== The detector ==
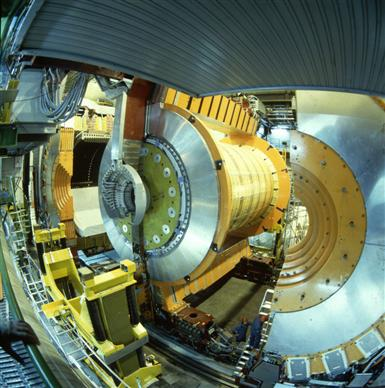
OPAL was one of the four large detectors at the Large Electron-Positron collider (1989–2000). The detector was dismantled in 2001 to make way for construction of the Large Hadron Collider (LHC).

The OPAL detector was about 12 m long, 12 m high and 12 m wide. The detector components were arranged around the beam pipe, in a layered structure like that of an onion. The tracking system of OPAL consisted of a silicon microvertex detector, a vertex detector, a jet chamber, and z-chambers (from the beam pipe out).

The silicon microvertex detector and the vertex chamber were used to locate decay vertices of short-lived particles, and to improve the momentum resolution. The central jet chamber identified particles from how much ionization they caused, and how far they curved in the magnetic field. These chambers worked well to identify tracks in the plane perpendicular to the beam axis. They were complemented by so-called "z-chambers" at the outside edge of the jet chamber, to provide precise measurements of the perpendicular coordinates of the tracks.

Further out from the beam pipe, OPAL's calorimeter system was divided into electromagnetic calorimeters (mostly made of lead-glass blocks), hadron calorimeters (part of the return yoke of the magnet, largely made of iron) and forward calorimeters placed around, and close to, the beam pipe at the two ends of the detector to catch particles thrown forwards by collisions in LEP. The end caps of the detector were also equipped with muon detectors.

In its first phase of operation from 1989 to 1995, electrons and positrons collided in LEP at 91 GeV. The aim was to produce Z bosons. OPAL accumulated millions of these Z events for high-precision measurements. In LEP's second phase from 1996 to 2000, the collider's collision energy was increased to make pairs of W bosons, and to search for possible new particles and new physics.
