= SND Experiment =

Detector for particle physics experiments

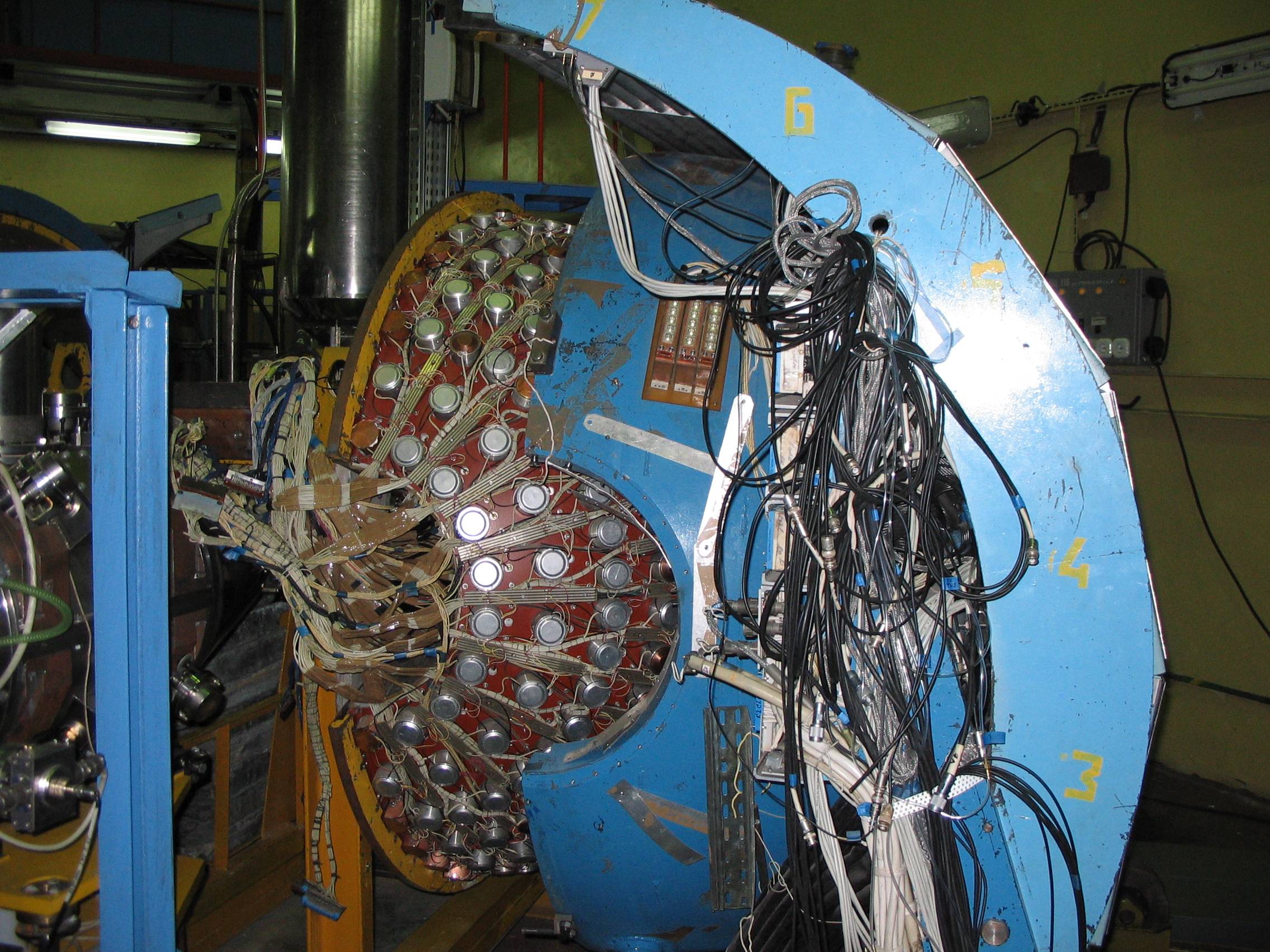
Spherical Neutral Detector in Budker INP, partially unmounted (2008).

Spherical Neutral Detector (SND) is a detector for particle physics experiments, successor of the Neutral Detector (ND), created by the team of physicists in the Budker Institute of Nuclear Physics (BINP), Novosibirsk, Russia. There are three major periods in evolution of the SND experiment;

- from 1995 to 2000 - data collection at the e^{+}e^{−} storage ring VEPP-2M in the energy range 2E=0.4-1.4 GeV,
- from 2001 to 2008 - upgrade of SND and the storage ring VEPP-2M to VEPP-2000,
- from 2009 - data collection at the e^{+}e^{−} storage ring VEPP-2000 in the energy range 2E=1.0-2.0 GeV.

== Physics ==
Previous experiment with ND (predecessor of SND) has shown that the e^{+}e^{−} annihilation in the final states with neutral particles in the energy range 2E=0.4-1.4 GeV is mediated by the processes which need to be studied in more details. In particular,

- quark structure of the light scalar mesons can be studied in electric-dipole radiative decays $\phi \to a_0(980) \gamma, ~~ f_0(975) \gamma$;
- precise measurement of the e^{+}e^{−}annihilation cross section into hadrons is the important component in definition of the muon anomalous magnetic dipole moment;
- precise measurement of the hadronic cross sections is necessary to study the radial excitation of the light vector mesons ρ, ω, and φ;
- measurement of the higher order quantum electrodynamic (QED) processes is important for the QED theory test.

This physics can be studied with dedicated detector at higher statistics. For this purpose the SND was constructed with many improvements relative to ND;

- the solid angle is covered up to 96% of 4π sr,
- the NaI(Tl) calorimeter has uniform spherical shape with fine segmentation in azimuthal and polar angles and 3 layers in radial direction,
- drift chamber is used as a central tracker,
- external anti-coincidence flat scintillation counters are enhanced by the coordinate system made of arrays of strimmer tubes.

== Experimental program ==
Experimental program of the SND is presented in Ref. and consists of items as follow.

- Radiative decays

$$e^+e^- \to \rho, \omega, \phi \to \pi^0 \gamma, \eta \gamma$$
$$\phi \to \eta^\prime \gamma$$
$$\phi \to a_0(980) \gamma, ~~ f_0(975) \gamma, ~~ \pi \pi \gamma, ~~ \eta \pi \gamma$$
$$\rho, \omega \to \pi \pi \gamma$$

- OZI and G-parity suppressed decays

$$\phi \to \omega \pi^0, ~~ \pi \pi, ~~ \eta \pi \pi$$
$$\rho \to \pi^+ \pi^- \pi^0$$
$$\omega \to \pi^+ \pi^-$$

- Electromagnetic decays

$$\rho, \omega, \phi \to \eta e^+e^-, ~~ \pi^0 e^+e^-$$

- e^{+}e^{−} annihilation into hadrons

$$e^+e^- \to 2\pi,~~ 3\pi,~~ 4\pi,~~ 5\pi$$
$$e^+e^- \to \omega \pi,~~ \eta \pi \pi,~~ \phi \pi$$
$$e^+e^- \to K^+ K^-,~~ K^0_S K^0_L ,~~ K K \pi$$

- Test of QED processes

$$e^+e^- \to 3\gamma , ~~ e^+e^- \gamma$$
$$e^+e^- \to 4 \gamma, ~~ e^+e^- \gamma \gamma , ~~  e^+e^- e^+e^-$$
$$e^+e^- \to 5\gamma, ~~  3\gamma e^+e^-, ~~ 4e\gamma$$

- Search for rare decays

$$K^0_S \to \gamma \gamma, ~~ 3\pi^0, ~~ 2\pi^0 \gamma, ~~ \pi^0 \gamma \gamma, ~~ \pi^0 e^+e^-$$
$$\eta \to  3\gamma, ~~  e^+e^-, ~~ 4e$$

- Search for C-even reactions

$$e^+e^- \to \eta^\prime,~~ a_0,~~ f_0,~~ a_2,~~ f_2$$

== Detector ==
The SND and its upgraded version are described in Refs. and, respectively. The detector design is illustrated in the R-θ view and 3-D plot of the NaI(Tl) calorimeter segmentation. Unique features of the SND and its sensitivity to the neutral particles are defined by the state-of-art NaI(Tl) calorimeter.

== Results ==
Data collected in the SND experiment from 1995 to 2000 corresponds to the integrated luminosity 30 pb^{−1} spread in the energy range 2E=0.4-1.4 GeV. Review of results of this experiment is presented in Refs. and. Results are included in the PDG Review. Complete list of publications from SND also covers recent results of the experiment in the energy range 2E=1.0-2.0 GeV started in 2009.

== See also ==
- ND experiment
- Budker Institute of Nuclear Physics
- Particle detector
