= Gas Dynamic Trap =

Magnetic mirror machine

The Gas Dynamic Trap is a magnetic mirror machine being operated at the Budker Institute of Nuclear Physics in Akademgorodok, Russia.

== Technical specifications ==
Dimensions The plasma inside the machine fills a cylinder of space, 7 meters long and 28 centimeters in diameter. The magnetic field varies along this tube. In the center the field is low; reaching (at most) 0.35 Teslas. The field rises to as high as 15 Teslas at the ends. This change in the strength is needed to reflect the particles and get them internally trapped (see: the magnetic mirror effect).

Heating The plasma is heated using two methods, simultaneously. The first is neutral beam injection, where a hot (25 keV), neutral beam of material is shot into the machine at a rate of 5 megawatts. The second is Electron cyclotron resonance heating, where electromagnetic waves are used to heat a plasma, analogous to microwaving it.

Performance As of 2016, the machine had achieved a plasma trapping beta of 0.6 for 5 milliseconds. It had reached an electron temperature of 1 keV using the method of Electron cyclotron resonance heating. It had reached an ion density of 1×10^{20} ions/m^{3}. The machine loses material out of the ends of the mirror but material is replenished at such a rate as to maintain a density inside the machine.

== Diagnostics ==
During any given experiment, operators can choose from at least 15 fusion diagnostics to measure the machines' behavior:

1. Thomson Scattering
2. Motional Stark Effect
3. CX Energy Analysis (2)
4. Rutherford Ion Scattering
5. Ion End Loss Analyzer
6. Microwave Interferometer
7. Dispersion Interferometer
8. Diamagnetic Loops
9. Langmuir Probes
10. Pyro electric Detectors
11. RF Probes
12. Beam Dump Calorimeters
13. NBI Sec. Electron Detectors
14. Neutron Detectors
15. Thermonuclear Proton Detectors

== Pictures of the GDT ==
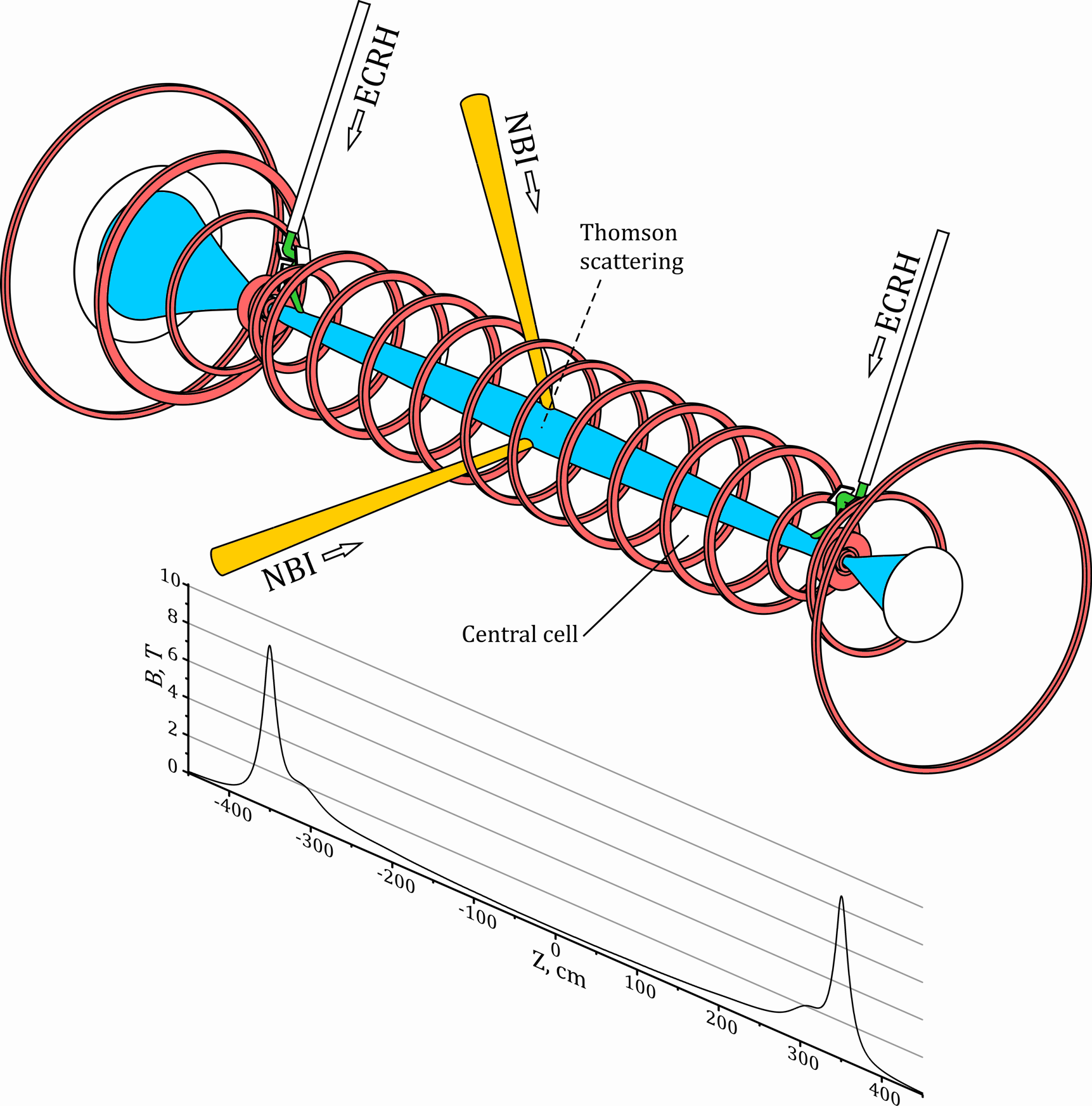
The structure of the Gas Dynamic Trap, showing the magnets (in red) and two methods of heating the plasma (Neutral beam injection) and (Electron Cyclotron Resonance Heating). Also shown is the magnetic field profile across the machine.

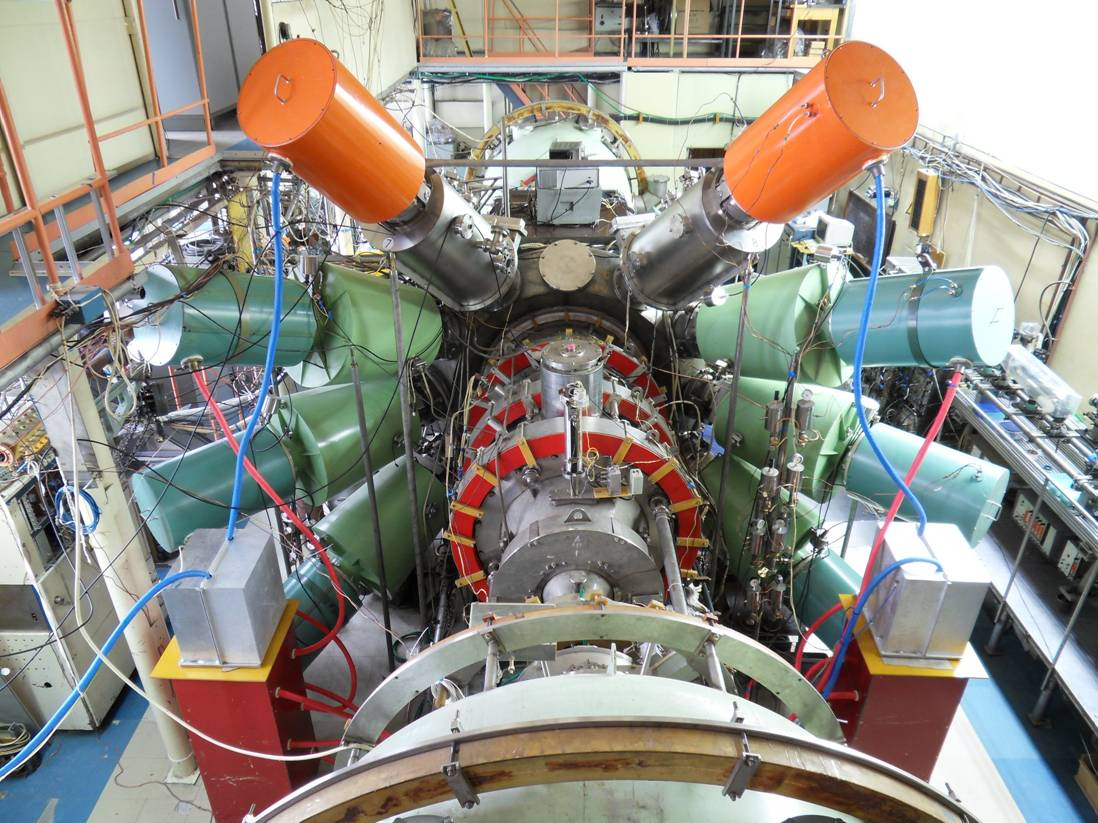
The Gas Dynamic Trap as seen from above.

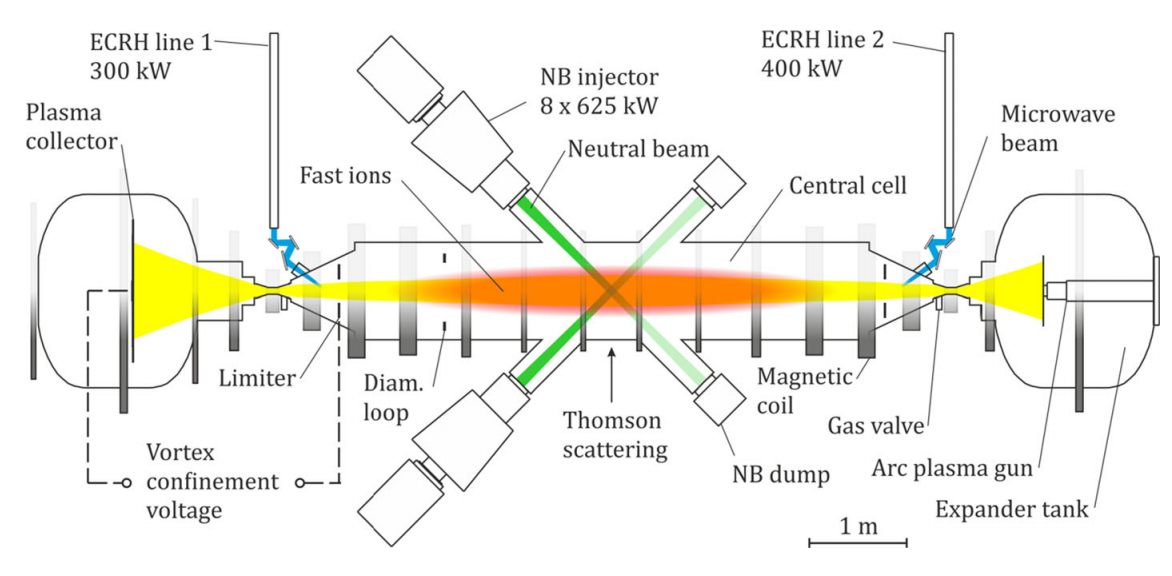
The location of the Diagnostics used to measure the behavior of the GDT.
