= Tail-pulse generator =

Tail pulse generators simulate the outputs of radiation detectors, photomultiplier tubes (PMT's) and their electronics. They in turn test systems and components for linearity, stability, resolution, pile-up and count rate effects. Tail pulse generators are differentiated from standard logic pulse generators in that the rise and fall times are exponential.

These simulate the outputs of Germanium detectors, plastic scintillators and their PMT's, NaI scintillators and their PMT's and LaBr3/LaCl3 scintillators and their PMT's. The random tail-pulse generators can test for pile-up and count rate effects. The fast tail-pulse generators can simulate the 5 ns FWHM pulses of faster PMT outputs. The precision tail-pulse generators can test linearity, stability and resolution.
