= DELPHI experiment =

Large Electron-Positron Collider experiments
- ALEPH: Apparatus for LEP PHysics
- DELPHI: DEtector with Lepton, Photon and Hadron Identification
- OPAL: Omni-Purpose Apparatus for LEP
- L3: Third LEP experiment

DELPHI (DEtector with Lepton, Photon and Hadron Identification) was one of the four main detectors of the Large Electron–Positron Collider (LEP) at CERN, one of the largest particle accelerators ever made. Like the other three detectors, it recorded and analyzed the result of the collision between LEP's colliding particle beams. The specific focus of DELPHI was on particle identification, three-dimensional information, high granularity (detail), and precise vertex determination.

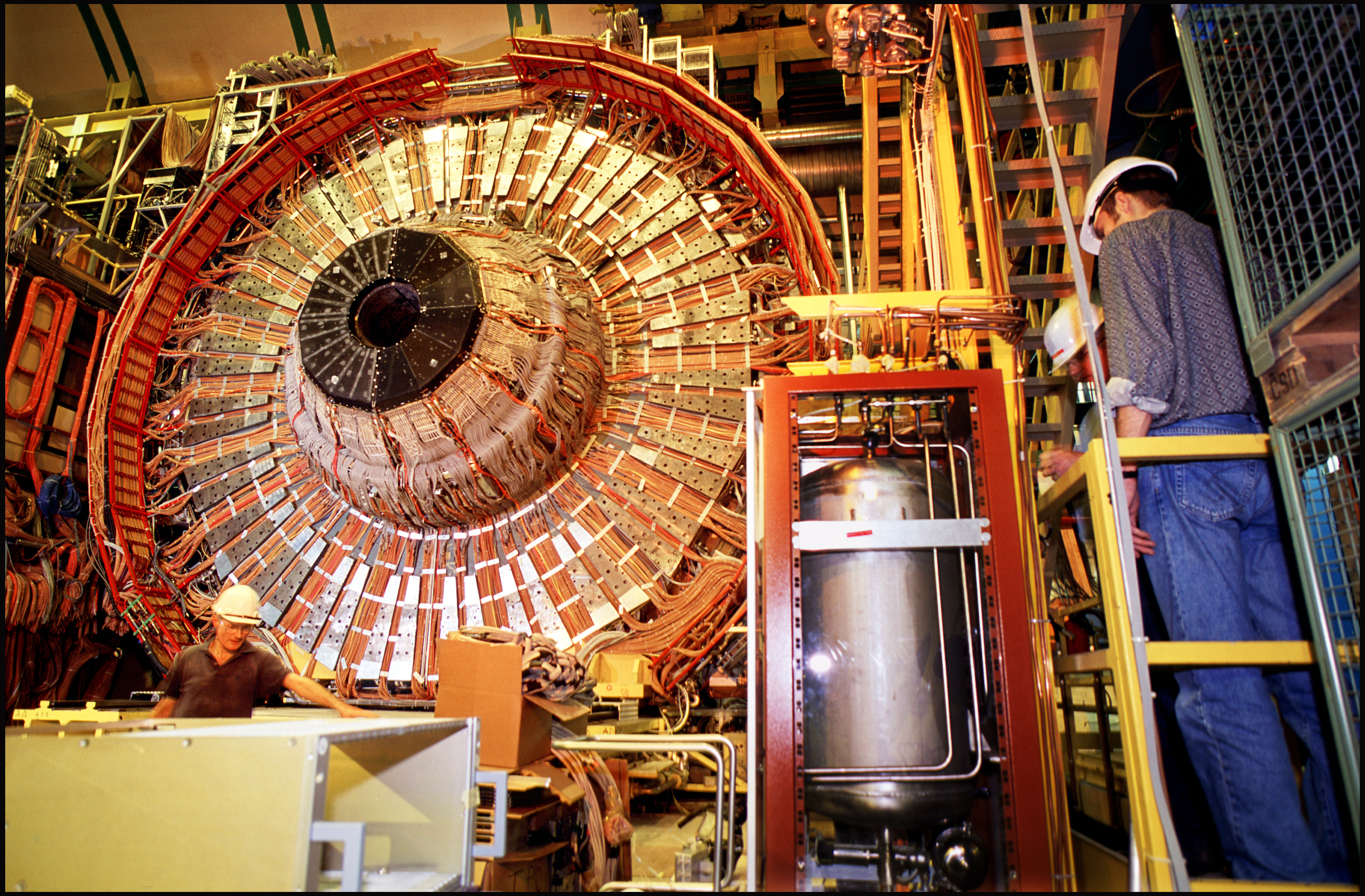
LEP dismantling work on DELPHI detector, Point 8

== Construction ==
The construction of DELPHI started in 1983 and was completed in 1988, ready for LEP starting operation in 1989. After LEP finished operating in November 2000, most of DELPHI began to be dismantled, and dismantling was complete in September 2001. The central section was kept and moved to an unused space (now the location of the LHCb experiment) where it was prepared as a 'museum' setup.

== Experimental setup ==
DELPHI had the shape of a cylinder over 10 metres in length and diameter, and a weight of 3500 tons. In operation, electrons and positrons from the accelerator went through a pipe going through the center of the cylinder, and collided in the middle of the detector. The collision products then travelled outwards from the pipe and were analyzed by many subdetectors designed to identify the nature and trajectories of the particles produced by the collision.

=== Subdetectors ===
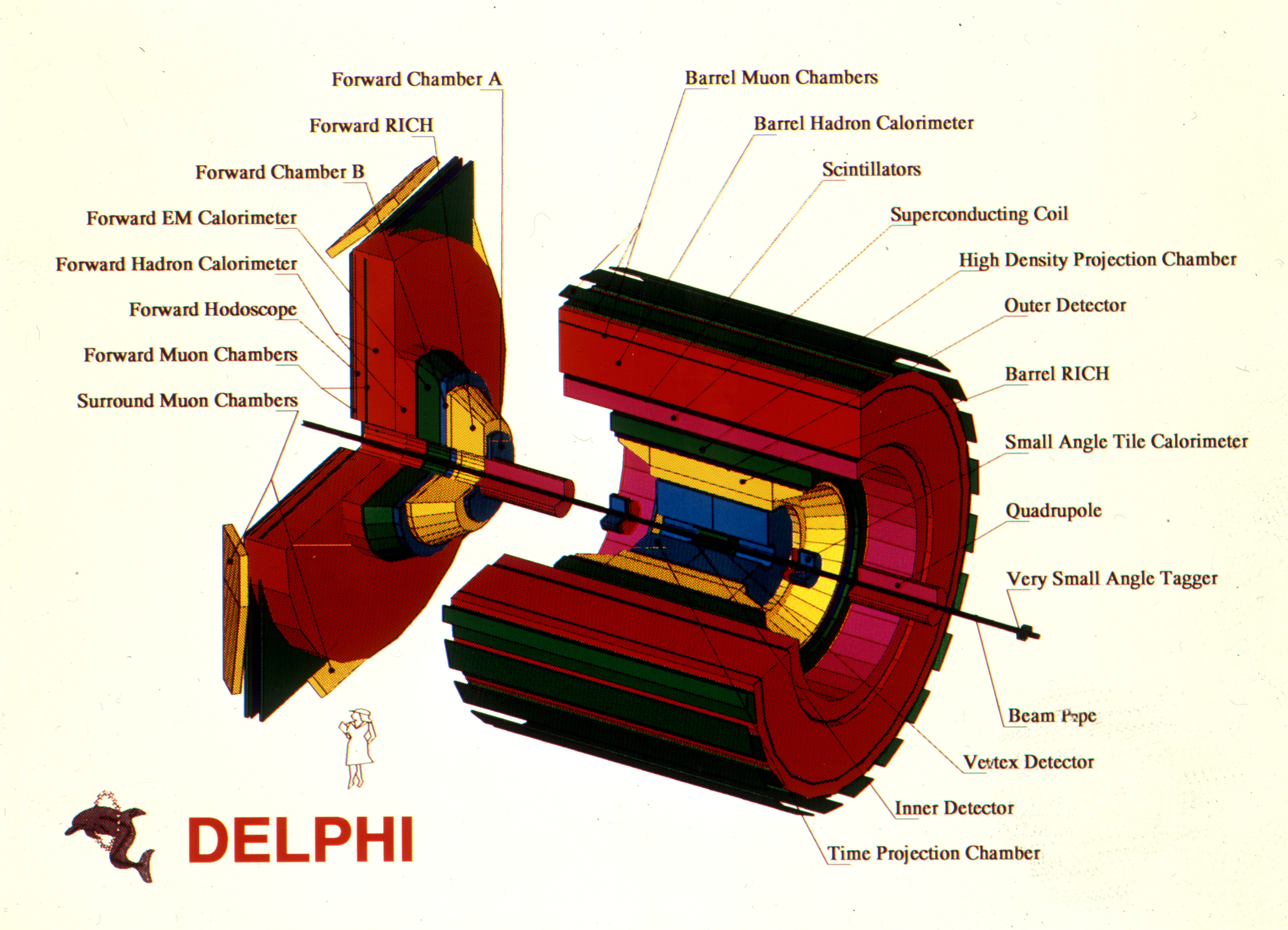
A cut-away diagram of the DELPHI experiment

There were five tracking detectors in the barrel part of the detector: the vertex detector (VD), the inner detector (ID), the time projection chamber (TPC), the outer detector (OD), and the barrel muon chambers (MUB).

The VD is an advanced silicon detector closest to the collision point, and has the purpose of providing precise tracking. Short-lived particles are found by extrapolating tracks back to an interaction point. An upgrade of the VD was completed in 1997 for it to form the barrel part of the silicon tracker.

The ID, between the VD and TPC, provides intermediate position and trigger data. The two parts of the detector are the JET drift chamber and the trigger layers (TL), producing points per track and polar angle coverage. The gas used in the JET chamber is mostly CO_{2}, with a small amount of isobutane, which allows signals caused by incoming particle tracks to arrive at the same time.

The TPC is the principle tracking device for DELPHI, also measuring the particle energy loss (dE/dX). The OD provides a final direction measurements after the Barrel Ring Imaging Cherenkov detector.

DELPHI is able to use the Ring Imaging Cherenkov technique to differentiate secondary charged particles produced by collisions. This was done using two RICH radiators of different refractive indices for particle identification in different ranges. The Barrel-RICH detector and the Forward-RICH detector were two independent detectors that covered different polar angles.

=== Tracking chambers ===
There were also four different tracking chambers in the forward part of the detector: forward chambers A (FCA) and B (FCB), the very forward tracker (VFT), the forward muon chambers (MUF) and the surround muon chambers (SMC). The forward chambers covered various polar angles of the forward part of the detector. The muon chambers were furthest from the collision point since muons can pass through the calorimeters.

=== Calorimeters and counters ===
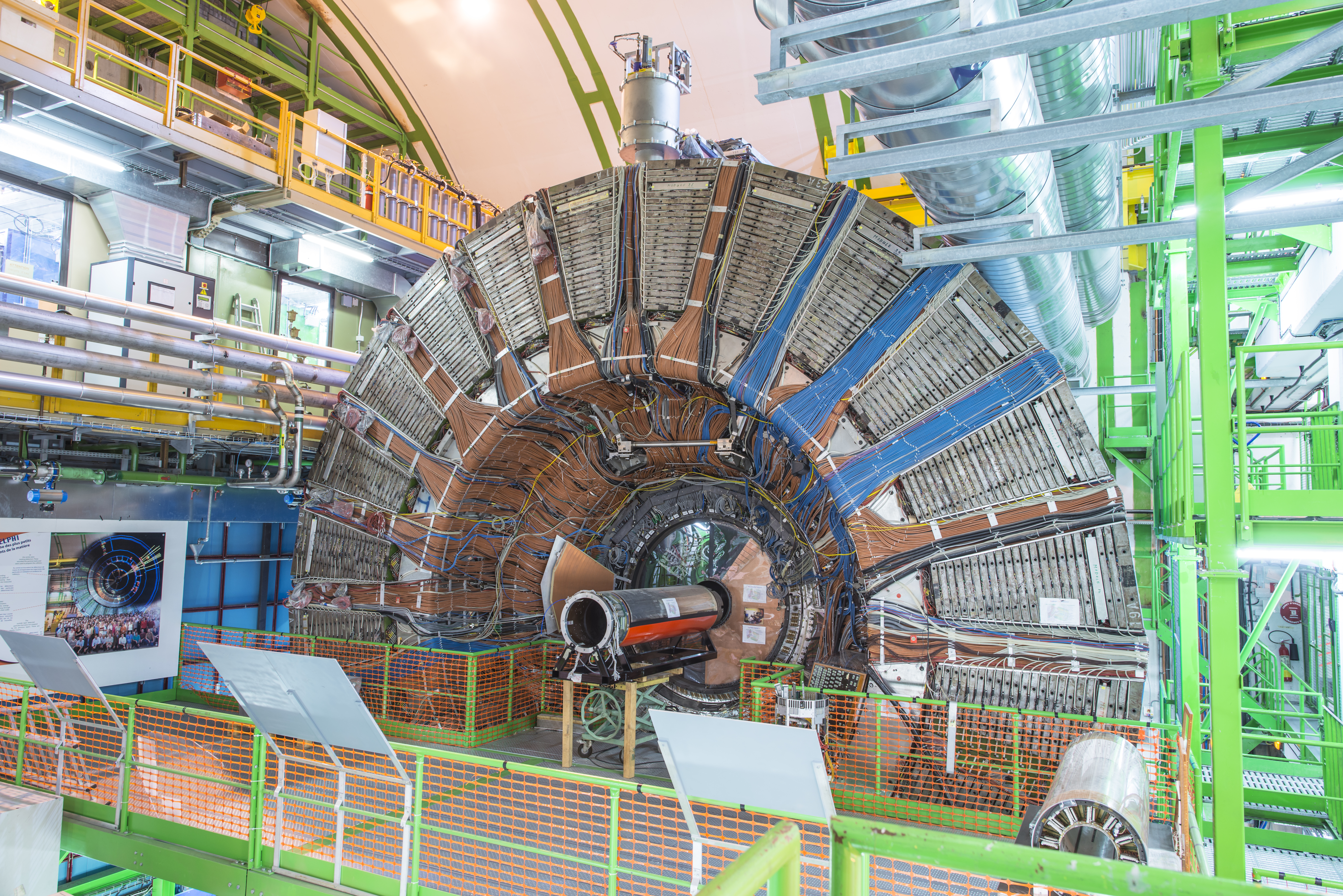
DELPHI detector at CERN

The electromagnetic calorimetry system consisted of two very forward calorimeters and two small angle calorimeter. The high-density projection chamber (HPC) was a barrel electromagnetic calorimeter mounted on the inside of the solenoid outside the OD. The forward electromagnetic calorimeter (FEMC) consisted of two 5 m diameter disks, made of lead glass. Additional scintillators were installed to ensure high energy photon did not escape.

The hadron calorimeter (HCAL) allows for calorimetric energy measurements of hadrons. It is a sampling gas detector which is incorporated in the magnet yoke, and covers a certain polar angle region.

Luminosity is measured using the small angle tile calorimeter (STIC) and the very small angle tagger (VSAT). To measure the luminosity, the number of events of a known process must be counted, which in the DELPHI experiment was chosen to be Bhabha scattering at small angles. The STIC is a lead-scintillator calorimeter consisting of two cylindrical detectors on either side of the interaction region, which covers a large angular region. The VSAT consists of four calorimeter modules and detects electrons and positrons produced in Bhabha scattering.

=== Trigger system ===
The purpose of the trigger system for DELPHI is to select all events from original electron-positron interactions. The trigger system has four levels of selectivity of increasing nature (T1, T2, T3, T4), using data contributions from each subdetector to inform the trigger decision of the first two levels. The last two levels are software filters.

== Results ==
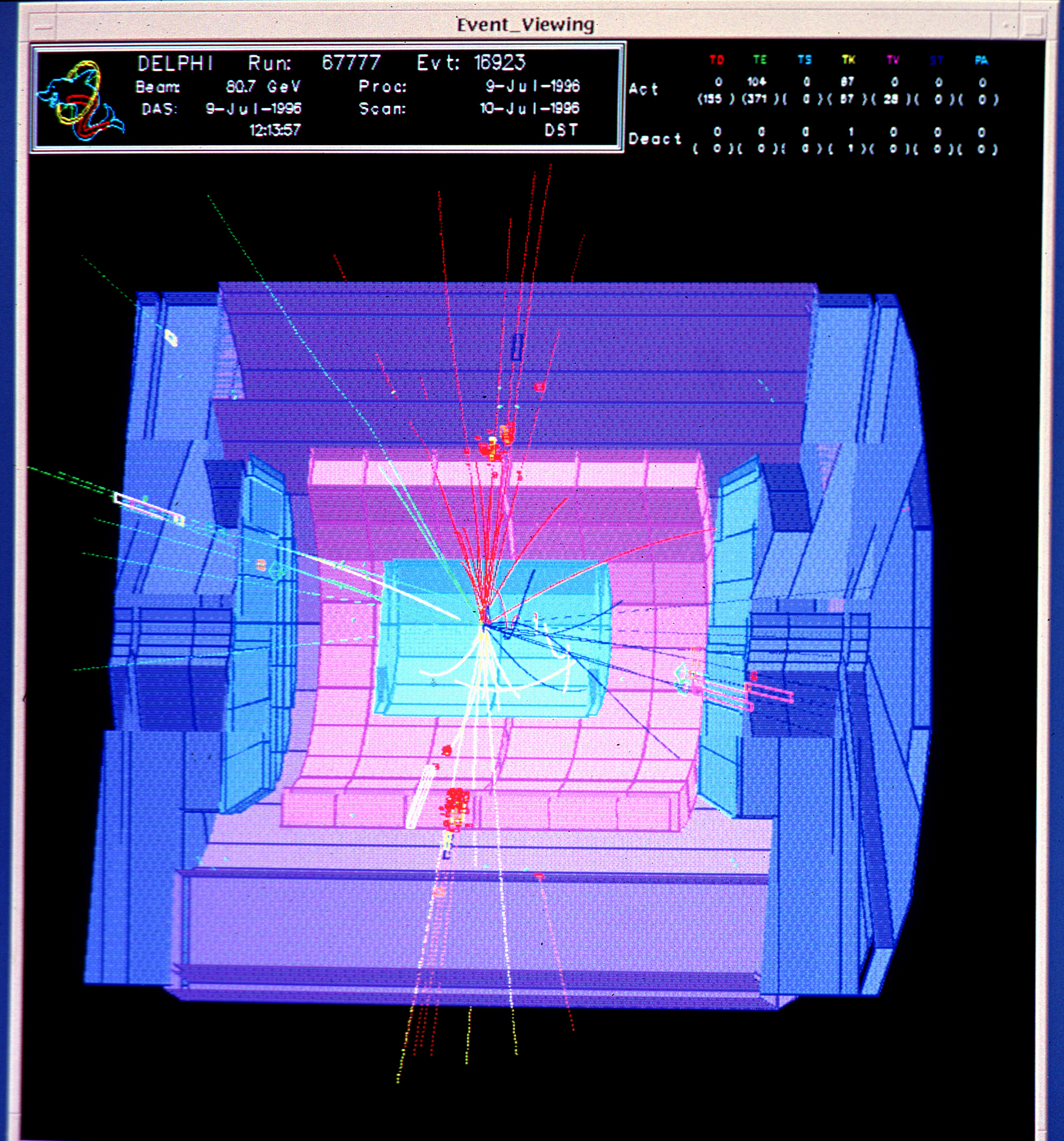
DELPHI: First W particles

The data produced from DELPHI allowed the e^{+}e^{−} → W^{+}W^{−} reaction to be studied for the first time. This was done by having center-of-mass energies over the threshold of WW pair production. From the data, the mass of the W boson was determined as 80.40 ± 0.45 GeV/c^{2} which was then combined with results from the other LEP collaborations to produce a final result compatible with other experiments.

The Higgs boson was also a subject of high interest for the DELPHI experiment, as Higgs bosons are produced in e^{+}e^{−} collisions. The cross section of this interaction is strongly dependent on the Higgs mass, so it can be calculated from measurements. The Higgs boson mass wasn't able to be determined using DELPHI, so only a mass exclusion limit could be given.

Furthermore during the LEP1 data taking runs in 1989-1995, hadronic and leptonic decays of the Z boson at 91 GeV were investigated and the widths of different branches were obtained. The results were in good agreement with the standard model predictions and expectations. Later in 1995, the experiment ran at intermediate energies of 130 and 136 GeV where, together with other LEP experiments, the results found were in agreement with model predictions.
