= Beijing Electron–Positron Collider II =

Chinese particle accelerator

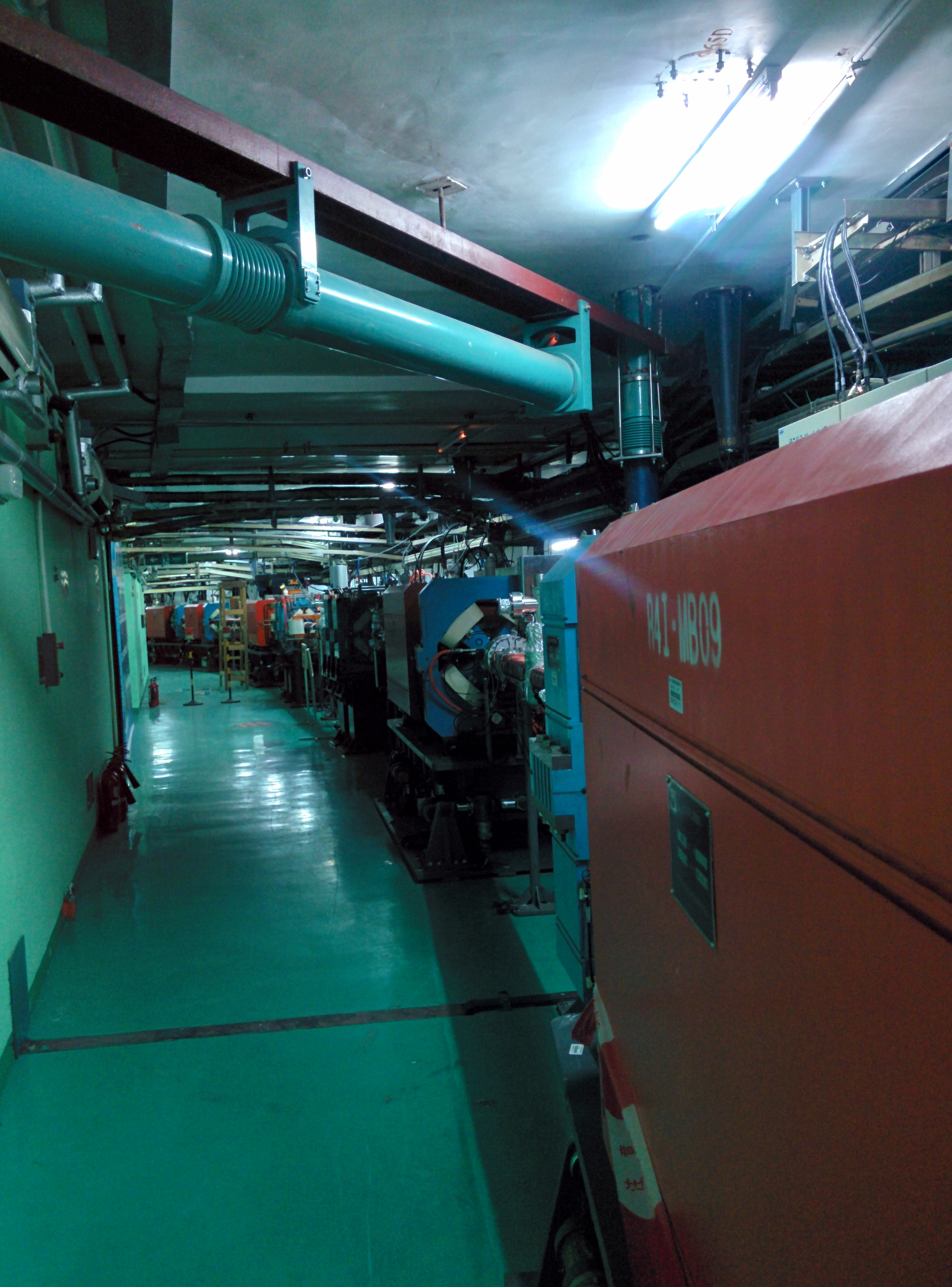

The Beijing Electron–Positron Collider II (BEPC II) is a Chinese electron–positron collider, a type of particle accelerator, located in Shijingshan District, Beijing, People's Republic of China. It has been in operation since 2008 and has a circumference of 240.4 m.

It was intended for high-energy physics experiments and continues as a CLEO-c detector. The center of mass energy can go up to 4.6 GeV with a design luminosity of 10^{33} cm^{−2}·s^{−1}. Operations began in summer 2008 and the machine has run at multiple energy levels.

== History ==
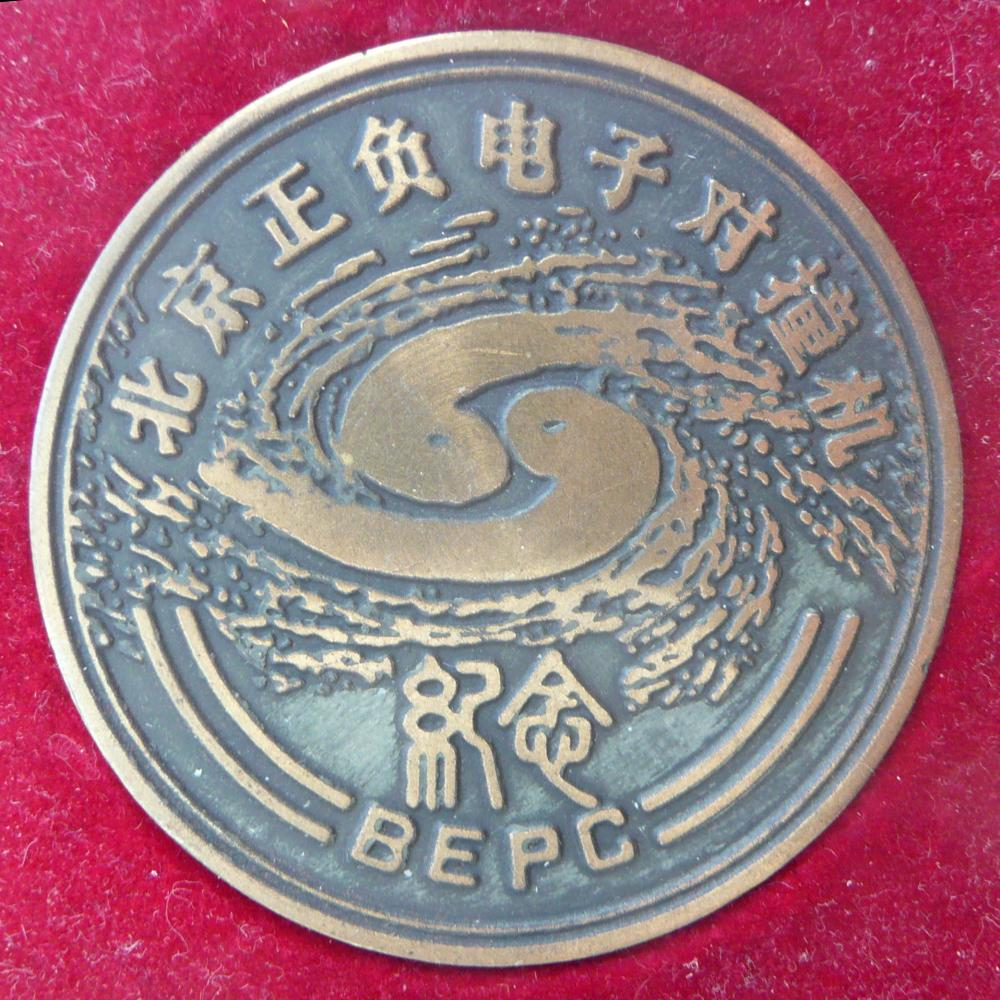
Medallion commemorating the groundbreaking.

The construction of the original Beijing Electron Positron Collider was approved in 1983, as China was emerging from the Cultural Revolution, based on a proposal developed by Xie Jialin, who went on to oversee the construction of the machine. The construction of this collider was considered so important that then vice-premier Deng Xiaoping attended the groundbreaking in 1984 and returned in 1988 as the machine neared operation.

The original Beijing Electron Positron Collider was commissioned in 1989 and decommissioning began in 2000 as plans were developed for BEPC II, although operation continued until 2004. The shape of the BEPC has been described as a tennis racquet, with a linac with a beam energy of from 1.5 to 2.8 GeV serving as the handle, injecting counter-rotating beams of particles into a storage ring at the head, giving collision energies in the range from 3.0 to 5.6 GeV. The BEPC was built to investigate tau-charm physics, using the Beijing Spectrometer. Major accomplishments of the original BEPC included precision measurement of the Tau mass.

== BES III ==
The BES III (Beijing Spectrometer III) is the main detector for the upgraded BEPC II.

BES III uses a large superconducting solenoid to provide a 1-tesla magnetic field, and also features a helium gas-based tracking chamber and an electromagnetic calorimeter using 6240 caesium iodide crystals.

== See also ==
- Large Electron–Positron Collider
- Super Charm-Tau factory
- Electron–positron annihilation
