= Unruh–DeWitt detector =

Model in theoretical physics

In theoretical physics, an Unruh–DeWitt detector is an idealized phenomenological model of a localized quantum probe used to operationalize the measurement of particles in curved or dynamical spacetimes. Introduced by William Unruh in 1976 to rigorously demonstrate the Unruh effect, and subsequently generalized by Bryce DeWitt in 1979, the canonical model consists of a two-level quantum system coupled via a monopole scalar interaction to a background quantum field.

The Unruh–DeWitt detector model serves as a foundational theoretical tool within quantum field theory in curved spacetime, providing a localized, algebraically defined observable that bypasses the ambiguities of global particle states when evaluating phenomena such as Hawking radiation and cosmological entanglement harvesting. It places quantum information within a relativistic space time.
