= L3 experiment =

Large Electron-Positron Collider experiments
- ALEPH: Apparatus for LEP PHysics
- DELPHI: DEtector with Lepton, Photon and Hadron Identification
- OPAL: Omni-Purpose Apparatus for LEP
- L3: Third LEP experiment

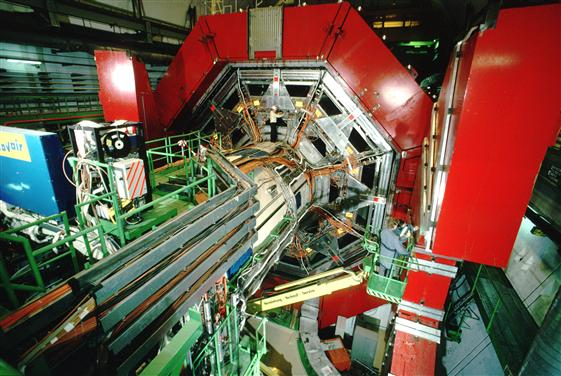
The muon spectrometer on the L3 detector at LEP with the magnet doors open. L3 was an experiment at the LEP collider (1989 to 2000)

The L3 experiment was one of the four large detectors on the Large Electron–Positron Collider (LEP). The detector was designed to look for the physics of the Standard Model and beyond. It started up in 1989 and stopped taking data in November 2000 to make room for construction of the Large Hadron Collider (LHC). Now, the ALICE detector sits in the cavern that L3 used to occupy, reusing L3's characteristic red octagonal magnet.

== Detector ==
The L3-detector was a multi-layered cylindrical set of different devices, each of them measuring physical quantities relevant to the reconstruction of the collision under study. Starting from the centre, close to the pipe where electrons and positrons circulate and collide, there were first the Silicon strip Microvertex Detector (SMD) and the Time Expansion Chamber (TEC). These two sub-detectors traced the paths of charged particles produced in the collision. One also gathered information about the momentum (a quantity related to mass and energy) of the particles by measuring their deflection in the magnetic field present in the detector. The three main outer layers were the electro-magnetic calorimeter (also called BGO because it is made of bismuth germanium oxide), the hadronic calorimeter (HCAL) and the muon detector.

Calorimeters are dense and stop most particles, measuring their energy. A set of scintillation counters was placed between the electro-magnetic and hadronic calorimeters: one of their functions was to help in recognising and rejecting signals coming from cosmic ray muons, very highly energetic particles which come from the space and can disturb the measurement.

The outermost layer contained the magnet that generated, inside the detector, a magnetic field about 10,000 times the average field on the surface of the Earth. This field deflected the charged particles which crossed it and the curvature of this deflection was a way of reconstructing the energy of the particles.

Another important part of the detector were the two luminosity monitors, placed along the beam on both sides of the interaction point. They measured the "luminosity" of the beam, which is a way of quantifying the rate of interactions produced.
