= Particle identification =

Procedure in particle physics

Particle identification is the process of using information left by a particle passing through a particle detector to identify the type of particle. Particle identification reduces backgrounds and improves measurement resolutions, and is essential to many analyses at particle detectors.

== Charged particles ==
Charged particles have been identified using a variety of techniques. All methods rely on a measurement of the momentum in a tracking chamber combined with a measurement of the velocity to determine the charged particle's mass, and therefore its identity.

=== Specific ionization ===
A charged particle loses energy in matter by ionization at a rate determined in part by its velocity. The energy loss per unit distance is typically called dE/dx. The energy loss is measured either in dedicated detectors, or in tracking chambers designed to also measure energy loss. The energy lost in a thin layer of material is subject to large fluctuations, and therefore accurate dE/dx determination requires a large number of measurements. Individual measurements in the low- and high-energy tails are excluded.

=== ΔE–E and ΔE–ΔE–E methods ===
The ΔE–E and ΔE–ΔE–E methods are widely used experimental techniques for particle identification. They explore the ionizing behaviour of different particles in matter in order to distinguish between them. These methods consist of stacking a series of two (ΔE–E) or three (ΔE–ΔE–E) detectors, where the first detector is thin enough to be punched through by the ionizing particle to be identified.

Detector-stacks like these are commonly called 'telescopes', and a common configuration consists of using one or two Silicon Surface Barrier Detector (SSBD) followed by a scintillation detector (like CsI(Tl)), where the remaining energy of the particle will be fully deposited.

=== Time of flight ===
Time-of-flight detectors determine charged particle velocity by measuring the time required to travel from the interaction point to the time-of-flight detector, or between two detectors. The ability to distinguish particle types diminishes as the particle velocity approaches its maximum allowed value, the speed of light, and thus is efficient only for particles with a small Lorentz factor.

=== Cherenkov detectors ===
Cherenkov radiation is emitted by a charged particle when it passes through a material with a speed greater than c/n, where n is the index of refraction of the material. The angle of the photons with respect to the charged particle's direction depends on velocity. A number of Cherenkov detector geometries have been used.

== Photons ==
Photons are identified because they can deposit energy inside the active volume of a detector. This energy deposition is punctual, and can happen according to different mechanisms, such as Compton scattering, pair production, or photoelectric effect.

== Electrons ==
Electrons appear as tracks in the inner detector and deposit all their energy in the electromagnetic calorimeter. The energy deposited in the calorimeter must match the momentum measured in the tracking chamber.

== Muons ==
Muons penetrate more material than other charged particles, and can therefore be identified by their presence in the outermost detectors.

== Tau particles ==
Tau identification requires differentiating the narrow "jet" produced by the hadronic decay of the tau from ordinary quark jets.

== Neutrinos ==
Neutrinos do not interact in particle detectors, and therefore escape undetected. Their presence can be inferred by the momentum imbalance of the visible particles in an event. In electron-positron colliders, both the neutrino momentum in all three dimensions and the neutrino energy can be reconstructed. Neutrino energy reconstruction requires accurate charged particle identification. In colliders using hadrons, only the momentum transverse to the beam direction can be determined.

== Neutral hadrons ==
Neutral hadrons can sometimes be identified in calorimeters. In particular, antineutrons and K^{0}_{L}s can be identified. Neutral hadrons can also be identified at electron-positron colliders in the same way as neutrinos.

== Heavy quarks ==
Quark flavor tagging identifies the flavor of quark that a jet comes from. B-tagging, the identification of bottom quarks, is the most important example. B-tagging relies on the bottom quark being the heaviest quark involved in a hadronic decay (tops are heavier, but to have a top in a decay, it is necessary to produce some heavier particle to have a subsequent decay into a top). This implies that the bottom quark has a short lifetime and it is possible to look for its decay vertex in the inner tracker. Additionally, its decay products are transversal to the beam, resulting in a high jet multiplicity. Charm tagging using similar techniques is also possible, but extremely difficult due to the lower mass. Tagging jets from lighter quarks is simply impossible; due to QCD background, there are simply too many indistinguishable jets.

== See also ==
- Spark chamber
- Wire chamber
