= VEPP-2000 =

Russian electron-positron collider

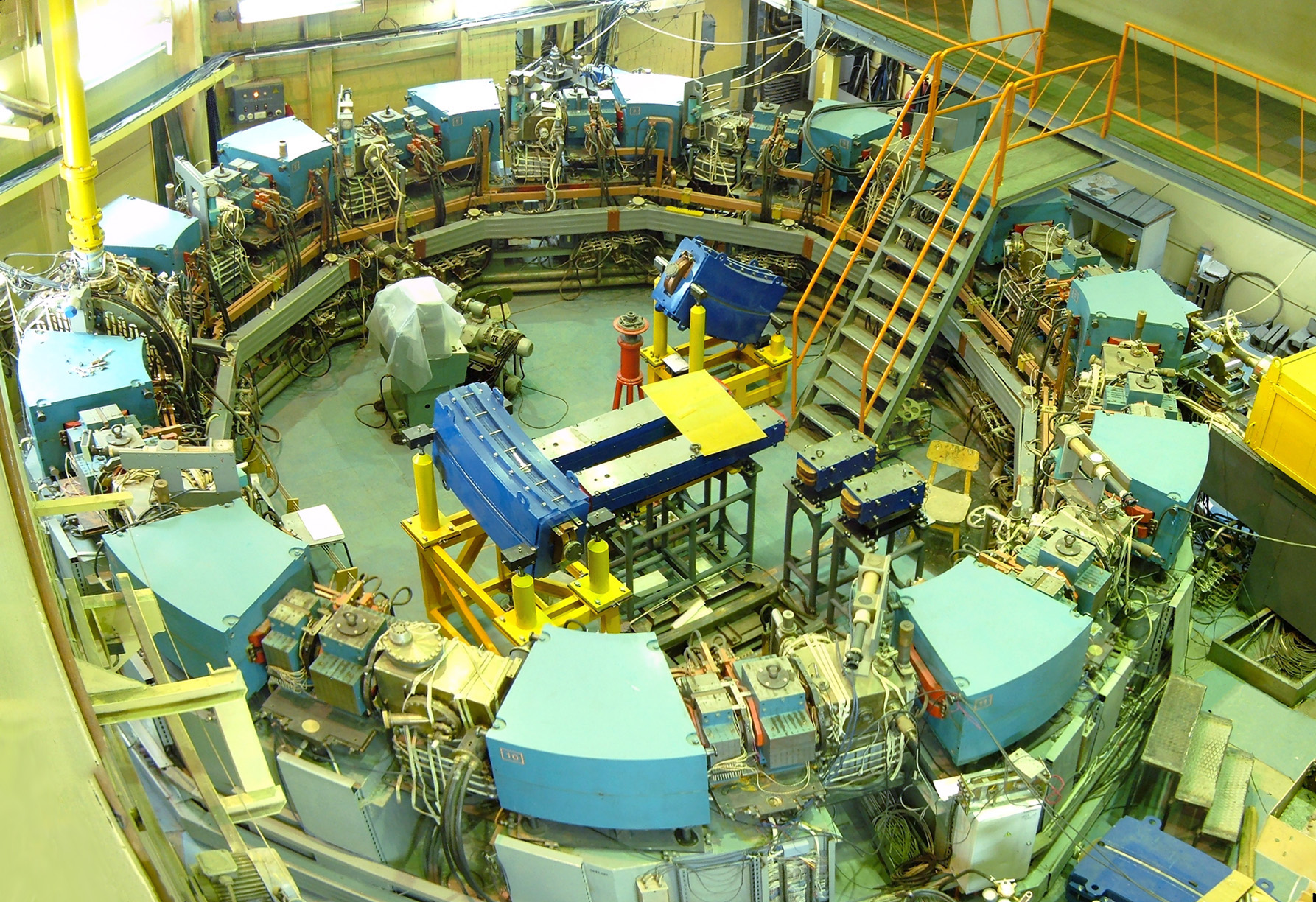
BEP — booster of electrons and positrons

VEPP-2000 (Russian: ВЭПП-2000) is an upgrade of the former VEPP-2M electron-positron collider (particle accelerator) at Budker Institute of Nuclear Physics (BINP) in Novosibirsk, Siberia, Russia.

== See also ==
- VEPP-5
