= Budker Institute of Nuclear Physics =

Research institute in Novosibirsk, Russia

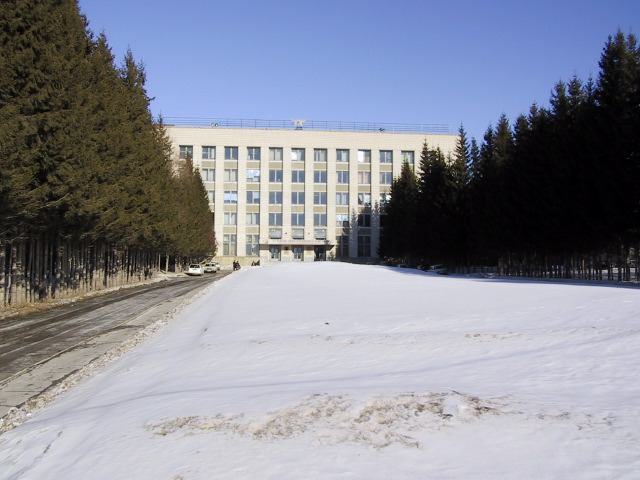

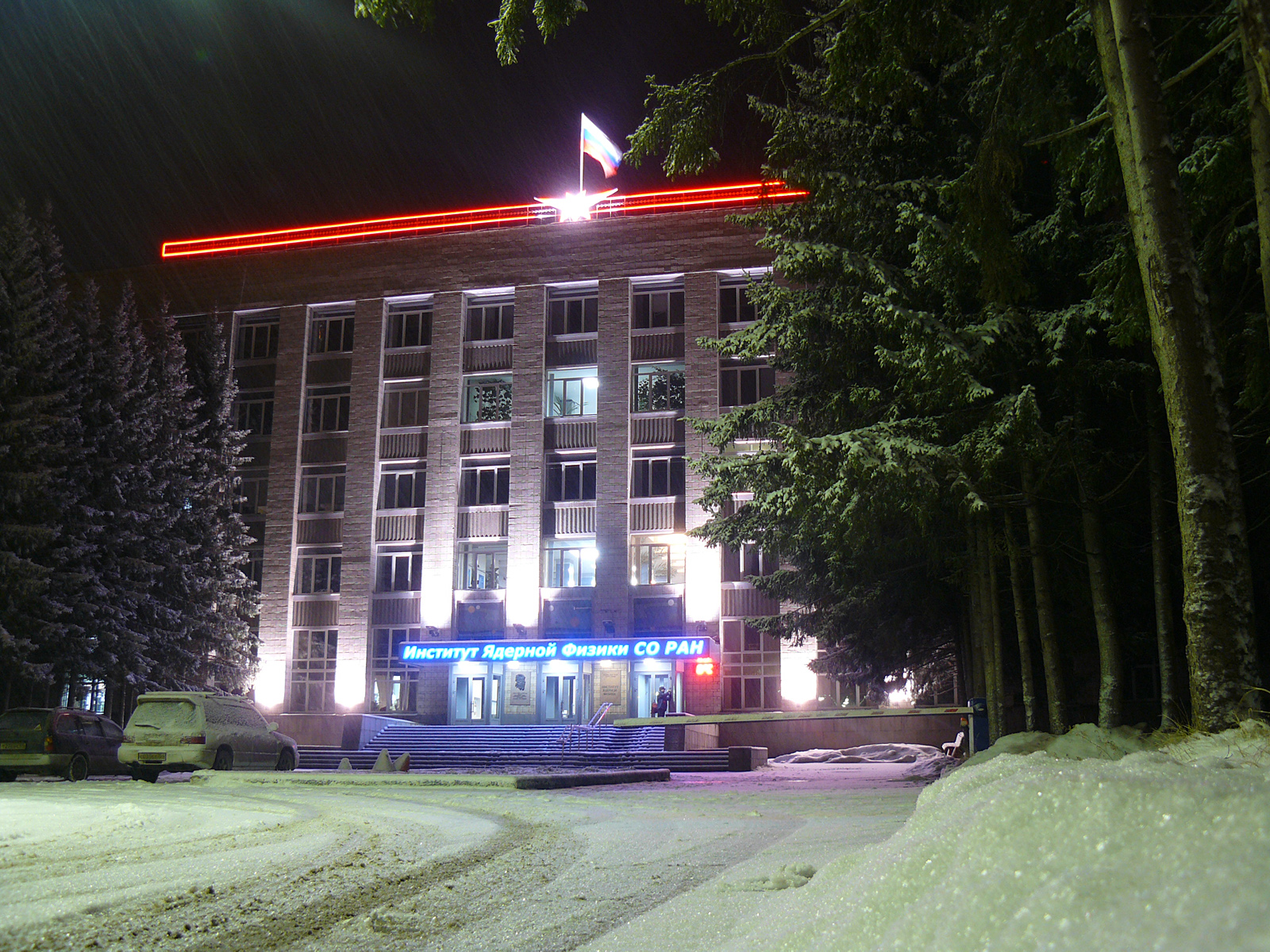
- Budker Institute of Nuclear Physics (BINP)
- Formation: 1959
- Type: Learned society
- Headquarters: Academician Lavrentyev Avenue, Novosibirsk, Akademgorodok, Russia
- Location: Russia
- Coordinates: 54°50′56″N 83°06′40″E
- Members: 3,000
- Official language: Russian
- Director: Pavel Logachyov
- Website: inp.nsk.su (in Russian)

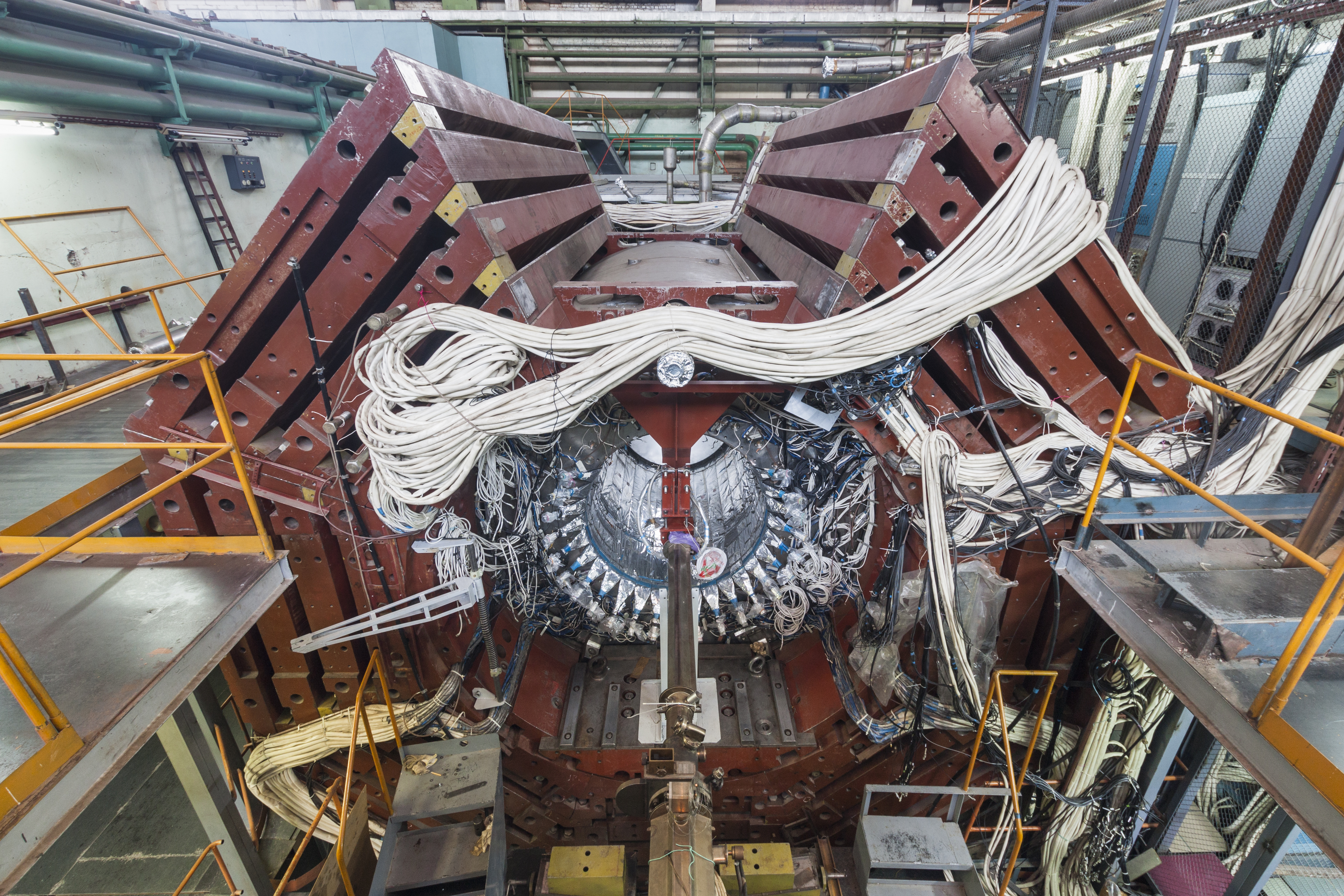
KEDR detector at VEPP-4M electron-positron collider

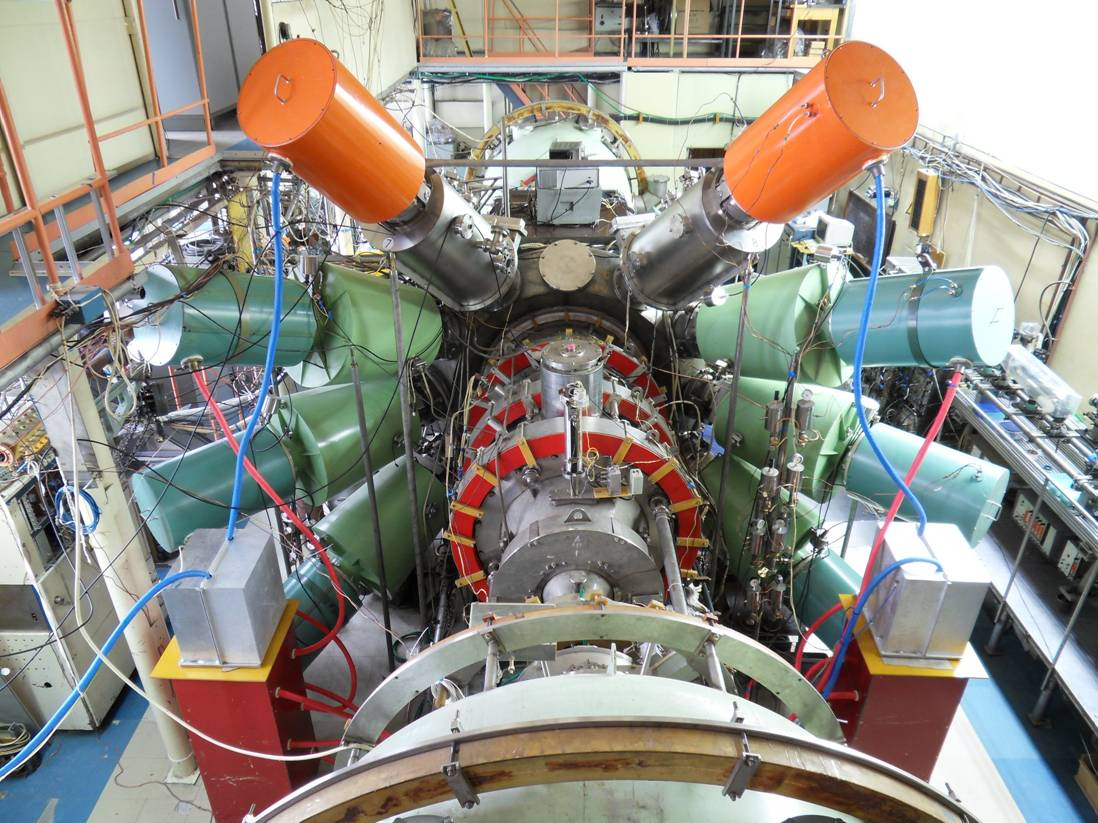
Plasma physics facility GDL

The Budker Institute of Nuclear Physics (BINP) is one of the major centres of advanced study of nuclear physics in Russia. It is located in the Siberian town Akademgorodok, on Academician Lavrentiev Avenue. The institute was founded by Gersh Budker in 1959. Following his death in 1977, the institute was renamed in honour of Budker.

Despite its name, the centre was not involved either with military atomic science or nuclear reactors— instead, its concentration was on high-energy physics (particularly plasma physics) and particle physics. In 1961 the institute began building VEP-1, the first particle accelerator in the Soviet Union which collided two beams of particles, just a few months after the ADA collider became operational at the Frascati National Laboratories in Italy in February 1961. The BINP employs over 3000 people, and hosts research groups and facilities.

In July 2023, the institute was put onto the USA sanction list in the context of Russian invasion of Ukraine.

== Active facilities ==
- VEPP-4 – e^{+}e^{−} collider for the energy range 2E_{beam} up to 12 GeV
  - KEDR – detector for particle physics at VEPP-4
  - ROKK-1 – facility for experiments with high energy polarized gamma-ray beams at VEPP-4
- VEPP-2000 – e^{+}e^{−} collider for the energy range 2E_{beam}=0.4-2.0 GeV
  - SND - Spherical Neutral Detector for particle physics experiments at VEPP-2000
  - CMD-3 – Creogenic Magnetic Detector for particle physics experiments at VEPP-2000
- Electron cooling experiments
- Plasma physics experiments
  - GOL3 – long open plasma trap
  - GDL - gas-dynamic plasma trap
- Siberian Synchrotron Radiation Centre
  - NovoFEL – Novosibirsk Free Electron Laser based on 4-turn ERL
- BNCT – accelerator-based neutron source for boron neutron capture cancer therapy experiments

== Participation in international projects ==
From 1993 to 2001, BINP contributed toward the construction of CERN's Large Hadron Collider, providing equipment including beamline magnets.

== Directors of the Institute ==
- Gersh Budker (1959–1977)
- Alexander N. Skrinsky (1977–2015)
- Pavel Logachyov (2015–)

== List of Scientists associated with this institute ==
- Arkady Vainshtein
- Iosif Khriplovich

== See also ==
- List of accelerators in particle physics
- List of synchrotron radiation facilities
- Particle detector
- Gas Dynamic Trap
- Institute for Theoretical and Experimental Physics, another Russian particle physics laboratory in the vicinity of Moscow; located in Moscow proper
- Institute for High Energy Physics, another Russian particle physics laboratory in the vicinity of Moscow; located south of Moscow
- Joint Institute for Nuclear Research, international particle physics laboratory in the vicinity of Moscow; located north of Moscow
