= Teresa Rodrigo =

Spanish scientist (1956–2020)

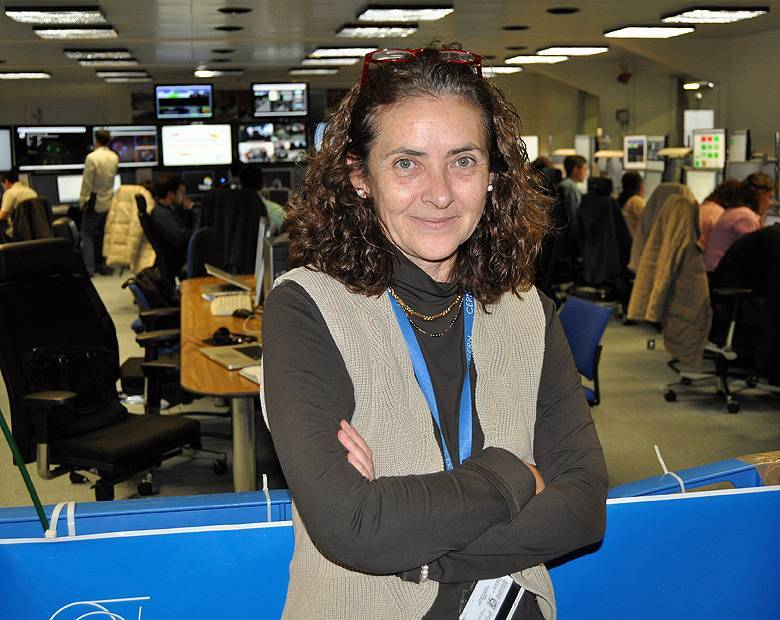
- Rodrigo at CERN's Compact Muon Solenoid facility in 2010.
- Born: Teresa Rodrigo Anoro; 1956; Lleida, Spain
- Died: 21 April 2020 (aged 63–64); Santander, Spain
- Education: University of Zaragoza; La Junta de Energía Nuclear
- Scientific career
- Fields: Particle physics; Atomic physics
- Workplaces: Fermilab; CERN; Instituto de Física de Cantabria

Teresa Rodrigo Anoro (1956 – 21 April 2020) was a Spanish scientist who worked in particle physics. She worked at CERN, Fermilab and the Instituto de Física de Cantabria and was professor at the University of Cantabria. Whilst at CERN, Rodrigo worked on the Compact Muon Solenoid and research for the Higgs boson.

== Career ==
In 1994, Rodrigo became a professor of atomic physics at the University of Cantabria. Rodrigo also worked at the Instituto de Física de Cantabria (IFCA) and Fermilab in the US. She worked on the Collider Detector at Fermilab experiment that discovered the top quark in 1995.

Rodrigo worked on Higgs boson research, and collaborated with CERN. She was the first Spanish female scientist to work at CERN, and worked on the UA1 experiment, and from 1994, she worked on the Compact Muon Solenoid (CMS) at the Large Hadron Collider in CERN. She managed a team of 30 IFCA employees on the CMS project, and managed one of the teams that worked on proving the existence of the Higgs boson. In 2010, she became president of CERN's International Collaboration Council, making her the first Spanish physicist to be part of the International Collaboration Council.

From 2016 to 2019, Rodrigo was a director of IFCA. She was the sixth director of IFCA, and the first female director. Rodrigo also collaborated on the European Strategy for Particle Physics.

== Awards ==
In 2014, Rodrigo was named one of the 100 most influential women in Spain by website Mujeresycia.com. In 2016, Rodrigo received the Julio Peláez Prize for Pioneers of Physical, Chemical and Mathematical Sciences for her work on the discovery of the Higgs boson.

== Personal life ==
Rodrigo was born in Lleida, Spain. She studied at the University of Zaragoza, and earned a PhD from La Junta de Energía Nuclear (now CIEMAT).

Rodrigo died on 21 April 2020 in Santander, Spain.
