= Future Circular Collider =

Proposed particle accelerator

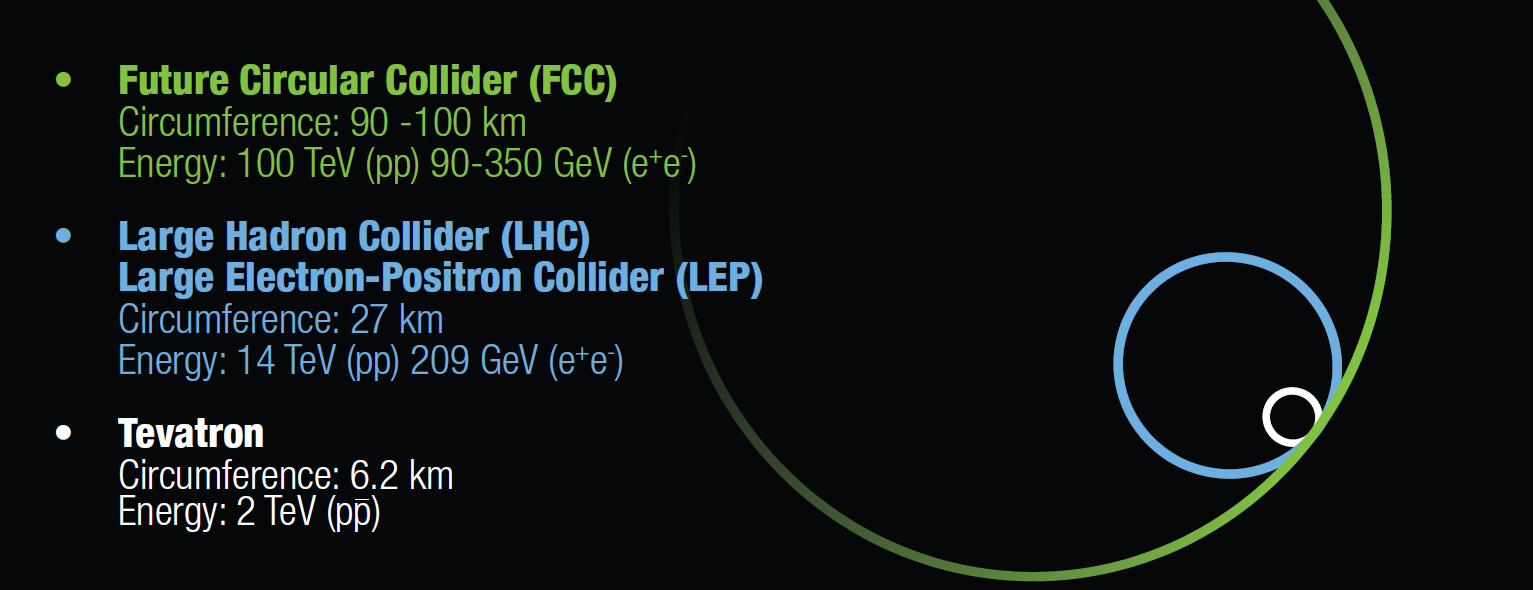
The future circular colliders considered under the FCC study compared to previous circular colliders

The Future Circular Collider (FCC) is a proposed particle accelerator with an energy significantly above that of previous circular colliders, such as the Super Proton Synchrotron, the Tevatron, and the Large Hadron Collider (LHC). The FCC project is considering three scenarios for collision types: FCC-hh, for hadron-hadron collisions, including proton-proton and heavy ion collisions, FCC-ee, for electron-positron collisions, and FCC-eh, for electron-hadron collisions.

In FCC-hh, each beam would have a total energy of 560 MJ. With a centre-of-mass collision energy of 100 TeV (vs 14 TeV at LHC) the total energy value increases to 16.7 GJ. These total energy values exceed the present LHC by nearly a factor of 30.

CERN hosted an FCC study exploring the feasibility of different particle collider scenarios with the aim of significantly increasing the energy and luminosity compared to existing colliders. It aims to complement existing technical designs for proposed linear electron/positron colliders such as the International Linear Collider and the Compact Linear Collider.

The study explores the potential of hadron and lepton circular colliders, performing an analysis of infrastructure and operation concepts and considering the technology research and development programmes that are required to build and operate a future circular collider. A conceptual design report was published in early 2019, in time for a scheduled update of the European Strategy for Particle Physics.

== Background ==
The CERN study was initiated as a direct response to the high-priority recommendation of the updated European Strategy for Particle Physics, published in 2013 which asked that "CERN should undertake design studies for accelerator projects in a global context, with emphasis on proton-proton and electron-positron high-energy frontier machines. These design studies should be coupled to a vigorous accelerator R&D programme, including high-field magnets and high-gradient accelerating structures, in collaboration with national institutes, laboratories and universities worldwide". The goal was to inform the next Update of the European Strategy for Particle Physics (2019–2020) and the wider physics community for the feasibility of circular colliders complementing previous studies for linear colliders as well as other proposal for particle physics experiments.

The launch of the FCC study was also in line with the recommendations of the United States' Particle Physics Project Prioritization Panel (P5) and of the International Committee for Future Accelerators (ICFA), a working group of the International Union of Pure and Applied Physics.

The discovery of the Higgs boson at the LHC, together with the absence so far of any phenomena beyond the Standard Model in collisions at centre of mass energies up to 8 TeV, has triggered an interest in future circular colliders to push the energy and precision frontiers complementing studies for future linear machines. The discovery of a "light" Higgs boson with a mass of 125 GeV revamped the discussion for a circular lepton collider that would allow detailed studies and precise measurement of this new particle. With the study of a new 80–100 km circumference tunnel (see also VLHC), that would fit in the Geneva region, it was realized that a future circular lepton collider could offer collision energies up to 400 GeV (thus allowing for the production of top quarks) at unprecedented luminosities. The design of FCC-ee (formerly known as TLEP (Triple-Large Electron-Positron Collider)) was combining the experience gained by LEP2 and the latest B-factories.

Two main limitations to circular-accelerator performance are energy loss due to synchrotron radiation, and the maximum value of magnetic fields that can be obtained in bending magnets to keep the energetic beams in a circular trajectory. Synchrotron radiation is of particular importance in the design and optimization of a circular lepton collider and limits the maximum energy that can be reached as the phenomenon depends on the mass of the accelerated particle. To address these issues a sophisticated machine design along with the advancement of technologies like accelerating (RF) cavities and high-field magnets are needed.

Future "intensity and luminosity frontier" lepton colliders like those considered by the FCC study would enable the study with very high precision of the properties of the Higgs boson, the W and Z bosons and the top quark, pinning down their interactions with an accuracy at least an order of magnitude better than today. The FCC-ee could collect 10^{12} Z bosons, 10^{8} W pairs, 10^{6} Higgs bosons and 4 · 10^{5} top-quark pairs per year. As a second step, an "energy frontier" collider at 100 TeV (FCC-hh) could be a "discovery machine" offering an eightfold increase compared to the current energy reach of the LHC.

The FCC integrated project, combining FCC-ee and FCC-hh, would rely on a shared and cost effective technical and organizational infrastructure, as was the case with LEP followed by LHC. This approach improves by several orders the sensitivity to elusive phenomena at low mass and by an order of magnitude the discovery reach for new particles at the highest masses. This will allow to uniquely map the properties of the Higgs boson and electroweak sector and broaden the exploration for different dark matter candidate particles complementing other approaches with neutrino beams, non-collider experiments and astrophysics experiments.

== Motivation ==
The LHC has advanced the science of matter and the Standard Model (SM). The discovery of the Higgs boson completed the particle-related component of the Standard Model of Particle Physics, the theory that describes the laws governing most of the known Universe. Yet the Standard Model cannot explain several observations, such as:

- evidence for dark matter,
- prevalence of matter over antimatter,
- the neutrino masses.

The Future Circular Collider (FCC) study develops options for potential high-energy frontier circular colliders at CERN for the post-LHC era. Among other things, it plans to look for dark matter particles, which account for approximately 25% of the energy in the observable universe. Though no experiment at colliders can probe the full range of dark matter (DM) masses allowed by astrophysical observations, there is a very broad class of models for weakly interacting massive particles (WIMPs) in the GeV – tens of TeV mass scale, and which could be in the range of the FCC.

FCC could also lead the progress in precision measurements of Electroweak precision observables (EWPO). The measurements played a key role in the consolidation of the Standard Model and can guide future theoretical developments. Moreover, results from these measurements can inform data from astrophysical/cosmological observations. The improved precision offered by the FCC integrated programme increases the discovery potential for new physics.

Moreover, FCC-hh will enable the continuation of the research programme in ultrarelativistic heavy-ion collisions from RHIC and LHC. The higher energies and luminosities offered by FCC-hh when operating with heavy-ions will open new avenues in the study of the collective properties of quarks and gluons.

The FCC study also foresees an interaction point for electrons with protons (FCC-eh). These deep inelastic scattering measurements will resolve the parton structure with very high accuracy providing a per mille accurate measurement of the strong coupling constant. These results are essential for a programme of precision measurements and will further improve the sensitivity of search for new phenomena particularly at higher masses.

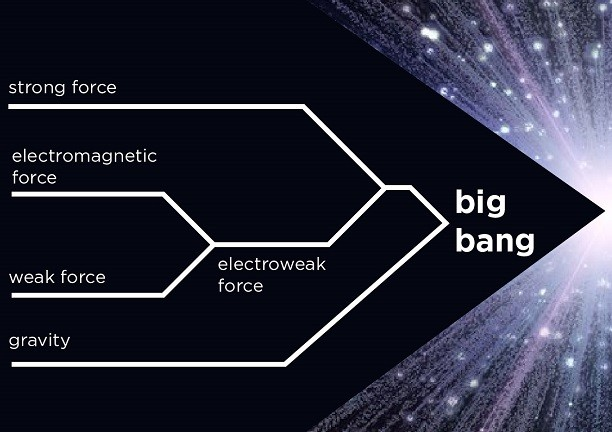
Five percent of the matter and energy in the Universe is directly observable. The Standard Model of Particle Physics describes it precisely. What about the remaining 95%?

== Scope ==
The FCC study originally put an emphasis on proton-proton (hadron or heavy-ion) high-energy collider that could also house an electron/positron (ee) high-intensity frontier collider as a first step. However after assessing the readiness of the different technologies and the physics motivation the FCC collaboration came up with the so-called FCC integrated programme foreseen as a first step FCC-ee with an operation time of about 10 years at different energy ranges from 90 GeV to 350 GeV, followed by FCC-hh with an operation time of about 15 years.

The FCC collaboration has identified the technological advancements required for reaching the planned energy and intensity and performs technology feasibility assessments for critical elements of future circular colliders (i.e. high-field magnets, superconductors, Radio-frequency cavities cryogenic and vacuum system, power systems, beam screen system, a.o). The project needs to advance these technologies to meet the requirements of a post-LHC machine but also to ensure the large-scale applicability of these technologies that could lead to their further industrialization. The study also provides an analysis of the infrastructure and operation cost that could ensure the efficient and reliable operation of a future large-scale research infrastructure. Strategic R&D has been identified in the CDR over the coming years will concentrate on minimising construction costs and energy consumption, whilst maximising the socio-economic impact with a focus on benefits for industry and training.

Scientists and engineers are also working on the detector concepts needed to address the physics questions in each of the scenarios (hh, ee, he). The work programme includes experiment and detector concept studies to allow new physics to be explored. Detector technologies will be based on experiment concepts, the projected collider performances and the physics cases. New technologies have to be developed in diverse fields such as cryogenics, superconductivity, material science, and computer science, including new data processing and data management concepts.

== Colliders ==
The FCC study developed and evaluated three accelerator concepts for its conceptual design report.

=== FCC-ee (electron / positron) ===
A lepton collider with centre-of-mass collision energies between 90 and 350 GeV is considered a potential intermediate step towards the realisation of the hadron facility. Clean experimental conditions have given e^{+}e^{−} storage rings a strong record both for measuring known particles with the highest precision and for exploring the unknown.

More specifically, high luminosity and improved handling of lepton beams would create the opportunity to measure the properties of the Z, W, Higgs, and top particles, as well as the strong interaction, with increased accuracy.

It can search for new particles coupling to the Higgs and electroweak bosons up to scales of Λ = 7 and 100 TeV. Moreover, measurements of invisible or exotic decays of the Higgs and Z bosons would offer discovery potential for dark matter or heavy neutrinos with masses below 70 GeV. In effect, the FCC-ee could enable profound investigations of electroweak symmetry breaking and open a broad indirect search for new physics over several orders of magnitude in energy or couplings.

Realisation of an intensity-frontier lepton collider, FCC-ee, as a first step requires a preparatory phase of nearly 8 years, followed by the construction phase (all civil and technical infrastructure, machines and detectors including commissioning) lasting 10 years. A duration of 15 years is projected for the subsequent operation of the FCC-ee facility, to complete the currently envisaged physics programme. This makes a total of nearly 35 years for construction and operation of FCC-ee

=== FCC-hh (proton / proton and ion / ion) ===
A future energy-frontier hadron collider will be able to discover force carriers of new interactions up to masses of around 30 TeV, if any exist. The higher collision energy extends the search range for dark matter particles well beyond the TeV region, while supersymmetric partners of quarks and gluons can be searched for at masses up to 15–20 TeV and the search for a possible substructure inside quarks can be extended down to distance scales of 10^{−21} m . Due to the higher energy and collision rate billions of Higgs bosons and trillions of top quarks will be produced, creating new opportunities for the study of rare decays and flavour physics.

A hadron collider will also extend the study of Higgs and gauge boson interactions to energies well above the TeV scale, providing a way to analyse in detail the mechanism underlying the breaking of the electroweak symmetry.

In heavy-ion collisions, the FCC-hh collider allows the exploration of the collective structure of matter at more extreme density and temperature conditions than before.

Finally, FCC-eh adds to the versatility of the research programme. The 50 TeV proton beam and the potential availability of a 60 GeV electron beam, expand the horizons of potential research, specifically for understanding deep inelastic scattering. The FCC-he collider could act as both a high-precision Higgs factory and a powerful microscope that could discover new particles, study quark / gluon interactions, and examine hypothesized substructure of matter.

In the FCC integrated scenario, the preparatory phase for an energy-frontier hadron collider, FCC-hh, will start in the first half of the FCC-ee operation phase. After the stop of FCC-ee operation, machine removal, limited civil engineering activities and an adaptation of the general technical infrastructure will take place, followed by FCC-hh machine and detector installation and commissioning, taking in total about 10 years. A duration of 25 years is projected for the subsequent operation of the FCC-hh facility, resulting in a total of 35 years for construction and operation of FCC-hh.

The staged implementation provides a time window of 20–30 years for R & D on key technologies for FCC-hh. This could allow alternative technologies to be considered e.g. high-temperature superconducting magnets, and should lead to improved parameters and reduced implementation risks, compared to immediate construction after HL-LHC.

=== High-Energy LHC ===
A high-energy hadron collider housed in the same tunnel but using new FCC-hh class 16T dipole magnets could extend the current energy frontier by almost a factor of 2× (27 TeV collision energy) and is expected to deliver an integrated luminosity of at least a factor of 3× larger than the HL-LHC. This machine could offer a first measurement of the Higgs self-coupling and directly produce particles at significant rates at scales up to 12 TeV – almost doubling the HL-LHC discovery reach for new physics. The project reuses the existing LHC underground infrastructure and large parts of the injector chain at CERN.

It is assumed that HE-LHC will accommodate two high-luminosity interaction-points (IPs 1 and 5) at the locations of the present ATLAS and CMS experiments while it could host two secondary experiments combined with injection as for the present LHC.

The HE-LHC could succeed the HL-LHC directly and provide a research programme of about 20 years beyond the middle of the 21st century.

== Technologies ==
As the development of a next generation particle accelerator requires new technology the FCC study has studied the equipment and machines that are needed for the realization of the project, taking into account the experience from past and present accelerator projects.

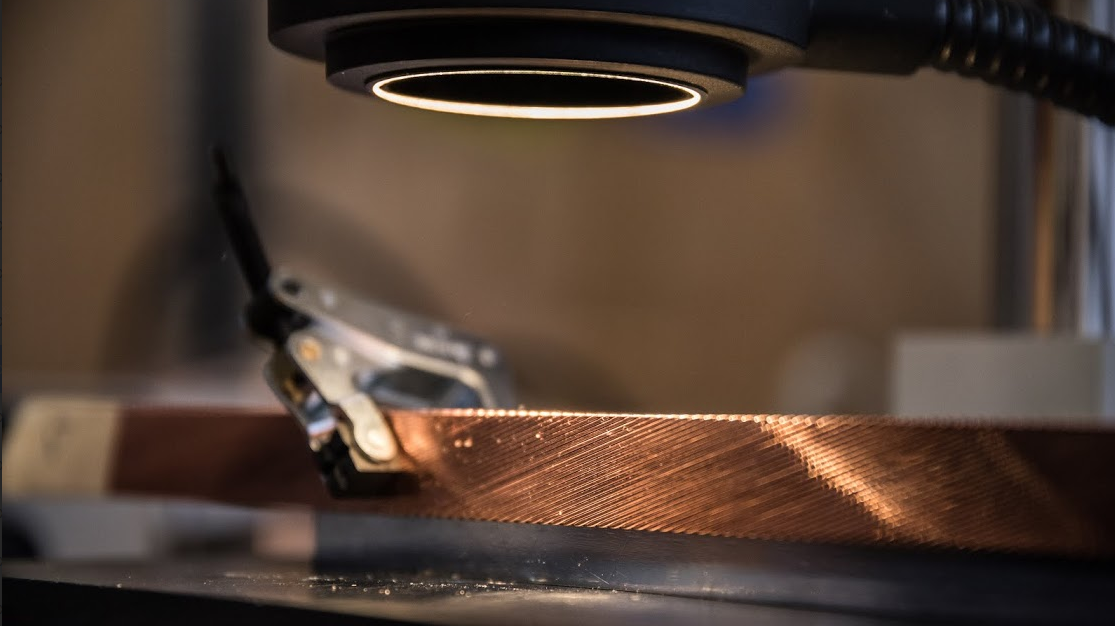
The FCC study drives the research in the field of superconducting materials.

The foundations for these advancements are being laid in focused R&D programmes:

- a 16-tesla high-field accelerator magnet and related super-conductor research,
- a 100 MW radiofrequency acceleration system that can efficiently transfer power from the electricity grid to the beams,
- a highly efficient large-scale cryogenics infrastructure to cool down superconducting accelerator components and the accompanying refrigeration systems.

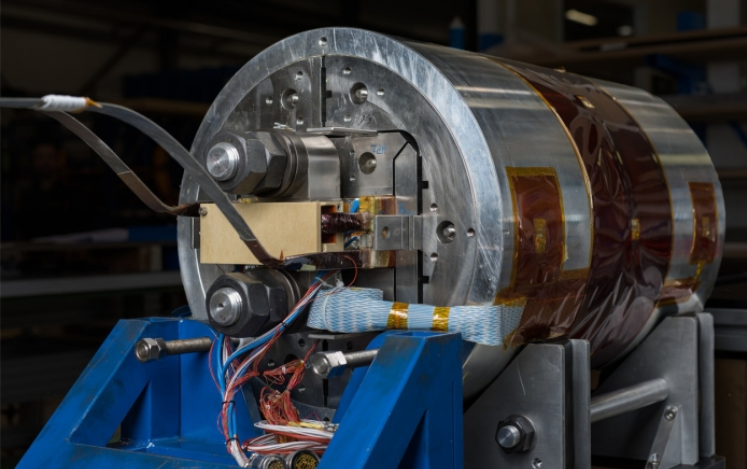
The CERN magnet group produced a 16.2-tesla peak field magnet – nearly twice that produced by the current LHC dipoles – paving the way for future more powerful accelerators.

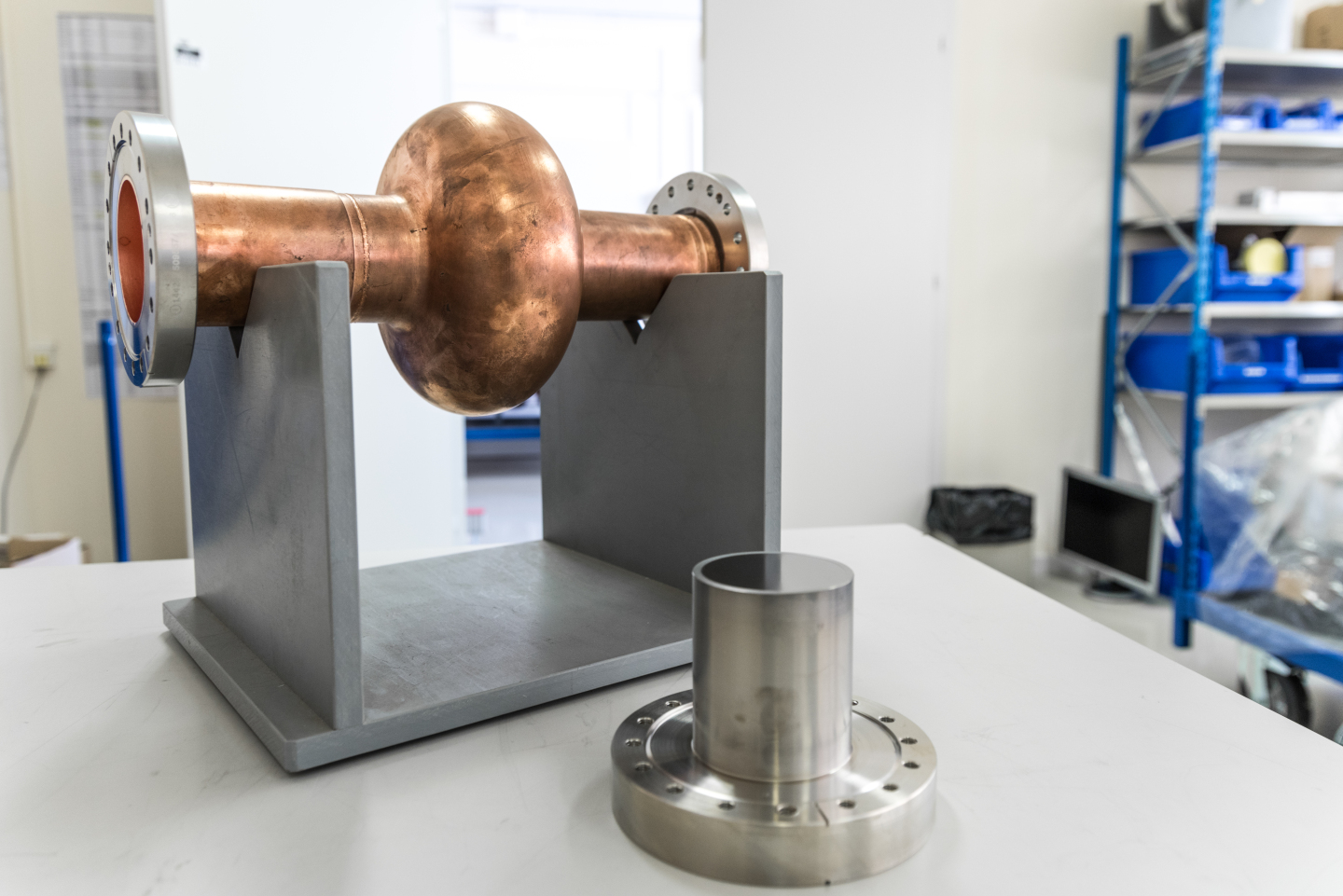
New superconducting radiofrequency (RF) cavities are developed to accelerate particles to higher energies.

Numerous other technologies from various fields (accelerator physics, high-field magnets, cryogenics, vacuum, civil engineering, material science, superconductors, ...) are needed for reliable, sustainable and efficient operation.

=== Magnet technologies ===
High-field superconducting magnets are a key enabling technology for a frontier hadron collider. To steer a 50 TeV beam over a 100 km tunnel, 16 tesla dipoles will be necessary, twice the strength of the magnetic field of the LHC.

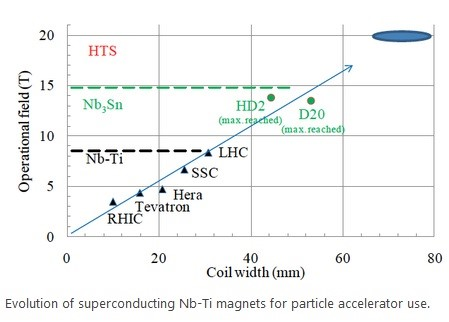
Evolution of superconducting niobium-titanium magnets for particle accelerator use

The main objectives of R&D on 16 T Nb_{3}Sn dipole magnets for a large particle accelerator is to prove that these types of magnets are feasible in accelerator quality and to ensure an adequate performance at an affordable cost. Therefore the goals are to push the conductor performance beyond present limits, to reduce the required "margin on the load line" with consequent reduction of conductor use and magnet size and the elaboration of an optimized magnet design maximizing performance with respect to cost.

The magnet R&D aims to extend the range of operation of accelerator magnets based on low-temperature superconductors (LTS) up to 16 T and explore the technological challenges inherent to the use of high-temperature superconductors (HTS) for accelerator magnets in the 20 T range.

=== Superconducting radiofrequency cavities ===
The beams that move in a circular accelerator lose a percentage of their energy due to synchrotron radiation: up to 5% every turn for electrons and positrons, much less for protons and heavy ions. To maintain their energy, a system of radiofrequency cavities constantly provides up to 50 MW to each beam. The FCC study has launched dedicated R&D lines on novel superconducting thin-film coating technology will allow RF cavities to be operated at higher temperature (CERN, Courier, April 2018), thereby lowering the electrical requirement for cryogenics, and reduce the required number of cavities thanks to an increase in the accelerating gradient. An ongoing R&D activity, carried out in close cooperation with the linear collider community, aims at raising the peak efficiency of klystrons from 65% to above 80%. Higher-temperature high-gradient Nb-Cu accelerating cavities and highly-efficient RF power sources could find numerous applications in other fields.

=== Cryogenics ===
Liquefaction of gas is a power-intensive operation of cryogenic technology. The future lepton and hadron colliders would make intensive use of low-temperature superconducting devices, operated at 4.5 K and 1.8 K, requiring very large-scale distribution, recovery, and storage of cryogenic fluids.

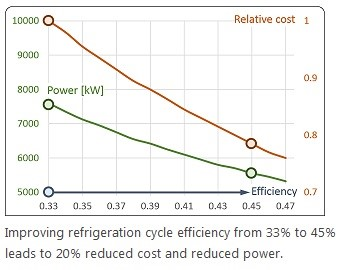
Improving refrigeration cycle efficiency from 33% to 45% leads to 20% reduced cost and power.

As a result, the cryogenic systems that have to be developed correspond to two to four times the presently deployed systems and require increased availability and maximum energy efficiency. Any further improvements in cryogenics are expected to find wide applications in medical imaging techniques.

The cryogenic beam vacuum system for an energy-frontier hadron collider must absorb an energy of 50 W per meter at cryogenic temperatures. To protect the magnet cold bore from the heat load, the vacuum system needs to be resistant against electron cloud effects, highly robust, and stable under superconducting quench conditions.

It should also allow fast feedback in the presence of impedance effects. New composite materials have to be developed to achieve these unique thermo-mechanical and electric properties for collimation systems. Such materials could also be complemented with the ongoing exploration of thin-film NEG coating that is used in the internal surface of the copper vacuum chambers.

=== Collimation ===
A 100 TeV hadron collider requires efficient and robust collimators, as 100 kW of hadronic background is expected at the interaction points. Moreover, fast self-adapting control systems with sub-millimeter collimation gaps are necessary to prevent irreversible damage of the machine and manage the 8.3 GJ stored in each beam.

To address these challenges, the FCC study searches for designs that can withstand the large energy loads with acceptable transient deformation and no permanent damage. Novel composites with improved thermo-mechanical and electric properties will be investigated in cooperation with the FP7 HiLumi LHC DS and EuCARD2 programmes.

== Timescale ==
The Large Hadron Collider at CERN with its High Luminosity upgrade is the world's largest and most powerful particle accelerator and is expected to operate until 2036. A number of different proposals for a post-LHC research infrastructure in particle physics have been launched, including both linear and circular machines.

The FCC study explores scenarios for different circular particle colliders housed in a new 100 km circumference tunnel, building on the tradition of the LEP and LHC, which are both housed in the same 27 km circumference tunnel. A time-frame of 30 years is appropriate for the design and construction of a large accelerator complex and particle detectors.

The experience from the operation of LEP and LHC and the opportunity to test novel technologies in the High Luminosity LHC provide a basis for assessing the feasibility of a post-LHC particle accelerator. In 2018, the FCC collaboration published the four volume Conceptual Design Report (CDR) as input to the next European Strategy for Particle Physics. The four volumes focus on: (a) "Vol. 1 Physics Opportunities"; (b) "Vol. 2 FCC-ee: The lepton collider"; (c) "Vol. 3 FCC-hh: The hadron collider"; and (d) "Vol. 4 The High-Energy LHC".

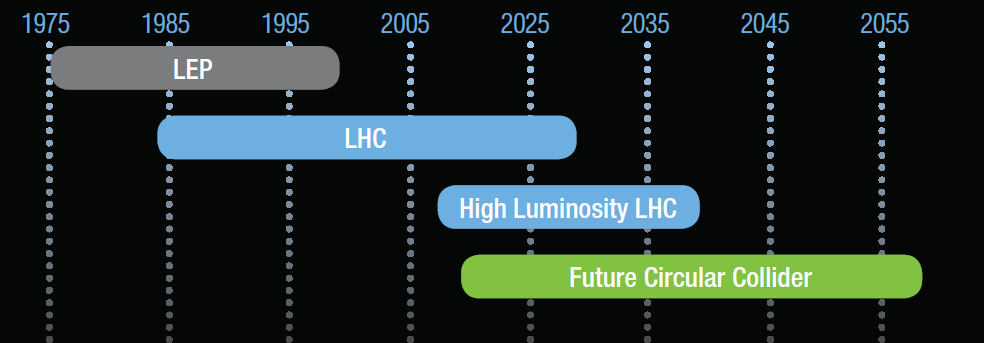
The significant lead time of approximately twenty years for the design and construction of a large-scale accelerator calls for a coordinated effort.

== Organisation ==
The FCC study, hosted by CERN is an international collaboration of 135 research institutes and universities and 25 industrial partners from all over the world.

The FCC study was launched following a response to the recommendation made in the update of the European Strategy for Particle Physics 2013, adopted by CERN's council. The study is governed by three bodies: the International Collaboration Board (ICB), the International Steering Committee (ISC), and the International Advisory Committee (IAC).

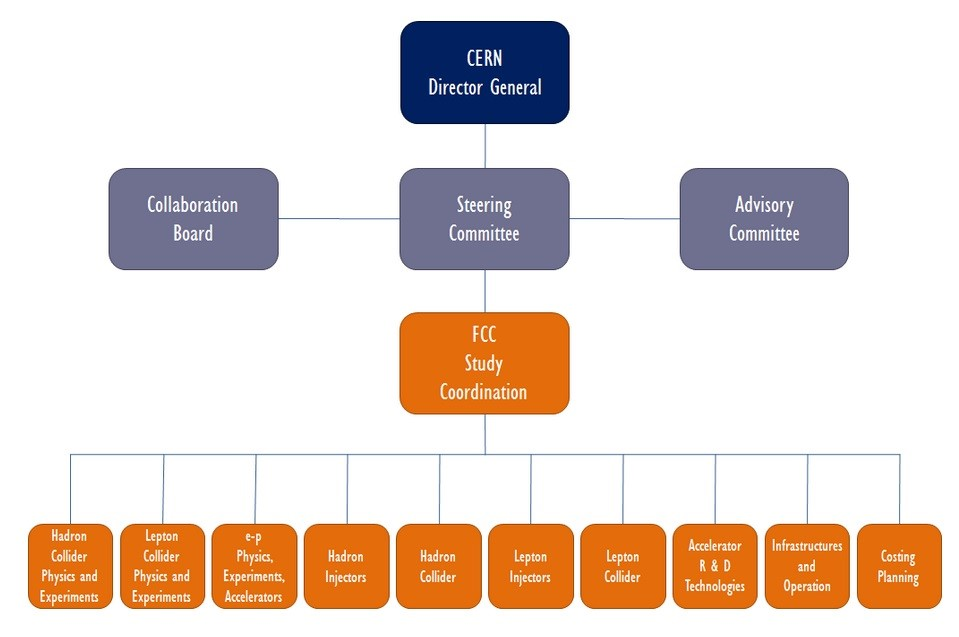
The organization of the FCC Study

The ICB reviews the resource needs of the study and finds matches within the collaboration. It so channels the contributions from the participants of the collaboration aiming at a geographically well-balanced and topically complementary network of contributions. The ISC is the supervisory and main governing body for the execution of the study and acts on behalf of the collaboration.

The ISC is responsible for the proper execution and implementation of the decisions of the ICB, deriving and formulating the strategic scope, individual goals and the work programme of the study. Its work is facilitated by the Coordination Group, the main executive body of the project, which coordinates the individual work packages and performs the day-to-day management of the study.

Finally, the IAC reviews the scientific and technical progress of the study and shall submit scientific and technical recommendations to the International Steering Committee to assist and facilitate major technical decisions.

=== Philanthropic funding ===
In December 2025, CERN announced that private sector philanthropists led by telecom and internet magnates Yuri Milner and Eric Schmidt (via the Breakthrough Prize Foundation and Schmidt Innovation Fund), along with John Elkann and Xavier Niel had pledged €860 million (US$1 billion) to fund CERN's bid to get its member states to approve the FCC. The philanthropists argued that the FCC would contribute not only new insights into the Standard Model but profound impacts on new technologies. CERN said the pledge was the first of its kind in the institution's history. As of then, the approval was expected to take place in 2028.

== Criticism ==
The FCC's proposed particle accelerator has been criticized for costs, with the cost for the energy-frontier hadron collider (FCC-hh) variant of this project projected to be over 20 billion US dollars.

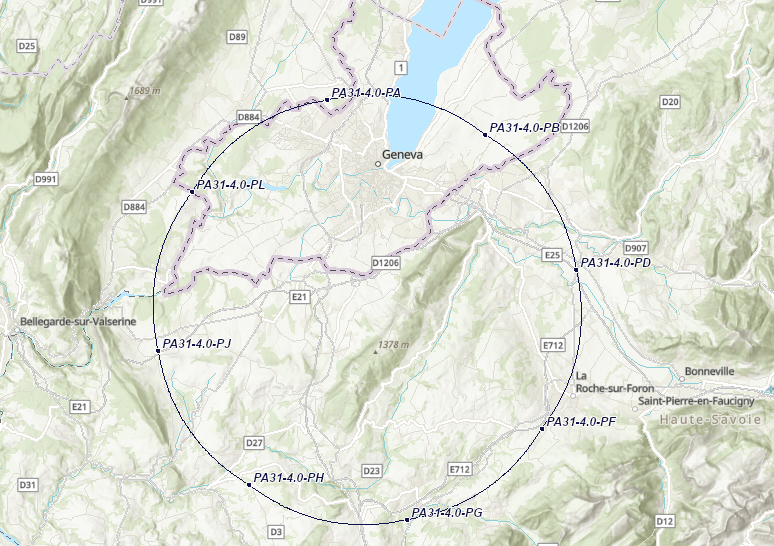
Layout and placement scenario PA31-4.0 of the FCC

Physicist, author, content creator Sabine Hossenfelder criticized a relevant promotional video for outlining a wide range of open problems in physics, despite the fact that the accelerator will likely only have the potential to resolve a small part of them. She noted that (as of 2019) there is "no reason that the new physical effects, like particles making up dark matter, must be accessible at the next larger collider".

=== Responses to criticism ===
Response to this criticism came both from within the physics community as well as from philosophers and historians of science who emphasized the exploratory potential of any future large-scale collider. A detailed physics discussion is included in the first volume of the FCC Conceptual Design Report. Gian Giudice, Head of CERN's Theoretical Physics Department wrote a paper on the "Future of High-Energy Colliders" while other commentary came from Jeremy Bernstein, Lisa Randall, James Beacham, Harry Cliff and Tommaso Dorigo among others. In an interview theorist for the CERN Courier, Nima Arkani-Hamed described the concrete experimental goal for a post-LHC collider: "While there is absolutely no guarantee we will produce new particles, we will definitely stress test our existing laws in the most extreme environments we have ever probed. Measuring the properties of the Higgs, however, is guaranteed to answer some burning questions. [...] A Higgs factory will decisively answer this question via precision measurements of the coupling of the Higgs to a slew of other particles in a very clean experimental environment." Moreover there has been some philosophical responses to this debate, most notably one from Michela Massimi who emphasised the exploratory potential of future colliders: "High-energy physics beautifully exemplifies a different way of thinking about progress, where progress is measured by ruling out live possibilities, by excluding with high confidence level (95%) certain physically conceivable scenarios and mapping in this way the space of what might be objectively possible in nature. 99.9% of the time this is how physics progresses and in the remaining time someone gets a Nobel Prize for discovering a new particle."

== Studies for linear colliders ==
A high-luminosity upgrade of the LHC [HL-LHC] has been approved to extend its operation lifetime into the mid-2030s. The upgrade will facilitate the detection of rare processes and improve statistical measurements.

The Future Circular Collider study complements previous studies for linear colliders. The Compact Linear Collider (CLIC) was launched in 1985 at CERN. CLIC examines the feasibility of a high-energy (up to 3 TeV), high-luminosity lepton (electron/positron) collider.

The International Linear Collider is a similar to CLIC project, planned to have a collision energy of 500 GeV. It presented its Technical Design Report in 2013. In 2013, the two studies formed an organisational partnership, the Linear Collider Collaboration (LCC) to coordinate and advance the global development work for a linear collider.

== See also ==
- Circular Electron Positron Collider – a proposed circular collider in China
- Compact Linear Collider – a post-LHC linear particle accelerator proposed at CERN
- International Linear Collider – a proposed linear particle accelerator in Japan
- Superconducting Super Collider – a US circular collider project with a circumference of 87 km, abandoned in 1993
