= Collider =

Type of particle accelerator that performs particle collisions

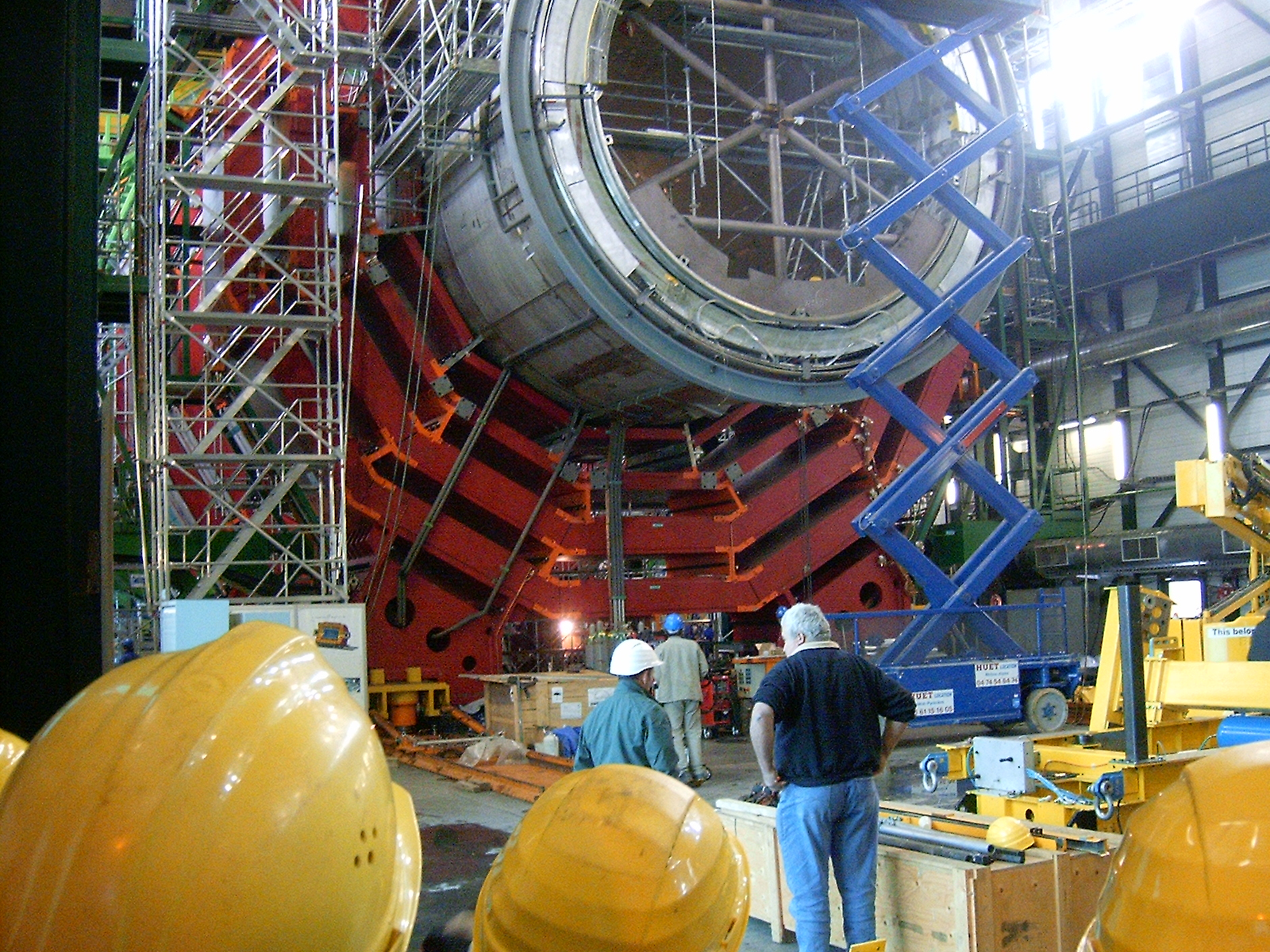
The central part of the Compact Muon Solenoid barrel with the vacuum tank, at the Large Hadron Collider at CERN

A collider is a type of particle accelerator that brings two opposing particle beams together such that the particles collide. Compared to other particle accelerators in which the moving particles collide with a stationary matter target, colliders can achieve higher collision energies. Colliders may either be ring accelerators or linear accelerators.

Colliders are used as a research tool in particle physics by accelerating particles to very high kinetic energy and letting them impact other particles. Analysis of the byproducts of these collisions gives scientists good evidence of the structure of the subatomic world and the laws of nature governing it. These may become apparent only at high energies and for extremely short periods of time, and therefore may be hard or impossible to study in other ways.

== Explanation ==
In particle physics one gains knowledge about elementary particles by accelerating particles to very high kinetic energy and guiding them to collide with other particles. For sufficiently high energy, a reaction occurs that transforms the particles into other particles. Detecting these products gives insight into the physics involved.

To do such experiments there are two possible setups:

- Fixed target setup: A beam of particles (the projectiles) is accelerated with a particle accelerator, and as collision partner, one puts a stationary target into the path of the beam.
- Collider: Two beams of particles are accelerated and the beams are directed against each other, so that the particles collide while flying in opposite directions.

The collider setup is harder to construct but has the great advantage that according to special relativity the energy of an inelastic collision between two particles approaching each other with a given velocity is not just 4 times as high as in the case of one particle resting (as it would be in non-relativistic physics); it can be orders of magnitude higher if the collision velocity is near the speed of light.

In the case of a collider where the collision point is at rest in the laboratory frame (i.e. $\vec p_1 = -\vec p_2$), the center of mass energy $E_\mathrm{cm}$ (the energy available for producing new particles in the collision) is simply $E_\mathrm{cm} = E_1 + E_2$, where $E_1$ and $E_2$ is the total energy of a particle from each beam. For a fixed target experiment where particle 2 is at rest, $E_\mathrm{cm}^2 = m_1^2 + m_2^2 + 2 m_2 E_1$.

== History ==
The first serious proposal for a collider originated with a group at the Midwestern Universities Research Association (MURA). This group proposed building two tangent radial-sector FFAG accelerator rings. Tihiro Ohkawa, one of the authors of the first paper, went on to develop a radial-sector FFAG accelerator design that could accelerate two counterrotating particle beams within a single ring of magnets. The third FFAG prototype built by the MURA group was a 50 MeV electron machine built in 1961 to demonstrate the feasibility of this concept.

Gerard K. O'Neill proposed using a single accelerator to inject particles into a pair of tangent storage rings. As in the original MURA proposal, collisions would occur in the tangent section. The benefit of storage rings is that the storage ring can accumulate a high beam flux from an injection accelerator that achieves a much lower flux.

The first electron-positron colliders were built in late 1950s-early 1960s in Italy, at the Istituto Nazionale di Fisica Nucleare in Frascati near Rome, by the Austrian-Italian physicist Bruno Touschek and in the US, by the Stanford-Princeton team that included William C.Barber, Bernard Gittelman, Gerry O'Neill, and Burton Richter. Around the same time, the VEP-1 electron-electron collider was independently developed and built under supervision of Gersh Budker in the Institute of Nuclear Physics in Novosibirsk, USSR. The first observations of particle reactions in the colliding beams were reported almost simultaneously by the three teams in mid-1964 - early 1965.

In 1966, work began on the Intersecting Storage Rings at CERN, and in 1971, this collider was operational. The ISR was a pair of storage rings that accumulated and collided protons injected by the CERN Proton Synchrotron. This was the first hadron collider, as all of the earlier efforts had worked with electrons or with electrons and positrons.

In 1968 construction began on the highest energy proton accelerator complex at Fermilab. It was eventually upgraded to become the Tevatron collider and in October 1985 the first proton-antiproton collisions were recorded at a center of mass energy of 1.6 TeV, making it the highest energy collider in the world, at the time. The energy had later reached 1.96 TeV and at the end of the operation in 2011 the collider luminosity exceeded 430 times its original design goal.

Since 2009, the most high-energetic collider in the world is the Large Hadron Collider (LHC) at CERN. It currently operates at 13 TeV center of mass energy in proton-proton collisions. More than a dozen future particle collider projects of various types - circular and linear, colliding hadrons (proton-proton or ion-ion), leptons (electron-positron or muon-muon), or electrons and ions/protons - are currently under consideration for detail exploration of the Higgs/electroweak physics and discoveries at the post-LHC energy frontier.

== Operating colliders ==
Sources: Information was taken from the website Particle Data Group.

| Accelerator | Centre, city, country | First operation | Accelerated particles | Max energy per beam, GeV | Luminosity, 10^{30} cm^{−2}s^{−1} | Perimeter (length), km |
|---|---|---|---|---|---|---|
| VEPP-2000 | INP, Novosibirsk, Russia | 2006 | e^{+}e^{−} | 1.0 | 100 | 0.024 |
| VEPP-4М | INP, Novosibirsk, Russia | 1994 | e^{+}e^{−} | 6 | 20 | 0.366 |
| BEPC II | IHEP, Beijing, China | 2008 | e^{+}e^{−} | 2.45 | 1000 | 0.240 |
| DAFNE | LNF, Frascati, Italy | 1999 | e^{+}e^{−} | 0.510 | 453 | 0.098 |
| SuperKEKB | KEK, Tsukuba, Japan | 2018 | e^{+}e^{−} | 7 (e^{−}), 4 (e^{+}) | 24000 | 3.016 |
| RHIC | BNL, New York, United States | 2000 | pp, Au-Au, Cu-Cu, d-Au, O-O | 255, 100/n | 245, 0.0155, 0.17, 0.85, unknown | 3.834 |
| LHC | CERN, Geneva, Switzerland/France | 2008 | pp, Pb-Pb, p-Pb, Xe-Xe | 6500 (planned 7000), 2560/n (planned 2760/n) | 21000, 0.0061, 0.9, 0.0004 | 26.659 |

== See also ==
- List of colliders
- Fixed-target experiment
- Large Electron–Positron Collider
- Large Hadron Collider
- Very Large Hadron Collider
- Relativistic Heavy Ion Collider
- International Linear Collider
- Storage ring
- Tevatron
- International Conference on Photonic, Electronic and Atomic Collisions
- Future Circular Collider
