= Katherine McAlpine =

American rapper

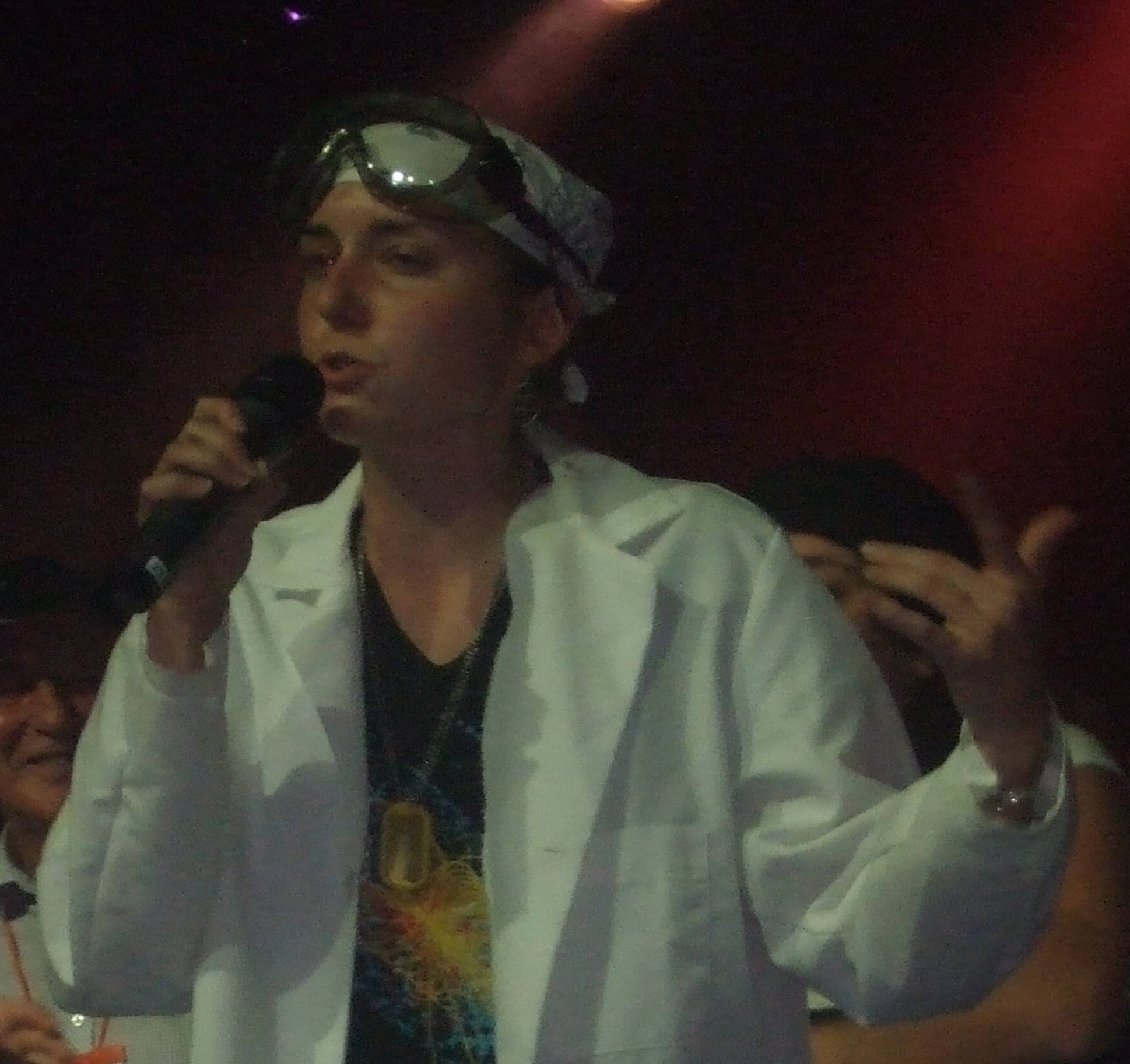
McAlpine performs her "Large Hadron Rap" as part of the festivities for the inauguration of the Large Hadron Collider on October 21, 2008

Katherine "Kate" McAlpine (born 1985) is an American science journalist and rapper. In 2008, while working at CERN, McAlpine wrote, produced and performed in the YouTube video "Large Hadron Rap" under the pseudonym "alpinekat". As of September 2018, the video has been viewed over 8 million times.

McAlpine has contributed articles to publications including New Scientist, ScienceNow, Physics World and Chemistry World. Since 2012, McAlpine has worked as a science writer and research news editor at the University of Michigan College of Engineering.

== Life and education ==
McAlpine was born in Cedar Rapids, Iowa and grew up in Montana. She earned dual degrees in Physics (B.A., Honors) and Professional Writing (B.A.) in 2007 from Michigan State University, East Lansing Michigan, where she was Phi Beta Kappa.

== Science rap videos ==
=== Large Hadron Rap ===
The YouTube video is a technically accurate but simplified introduction to the Large Hadron Collider operated by CERN. The video explains its purpose, methods and significance using rap lyrics, created by McAlpine mostly during her commutes on buses and trams to and from work. The video appeared on July 28, 2008, its music was written by Will Barras, and according to the video credits, the dancers "prefer to remain anonymous". The video has become a viral hit, surpassing eight million YouTube views since July 2012.

McAlpine stated one reason for creating the rap as, "I mostly wanted to explain what the project was about and hopefully when people - I hope they will - look a little more closely at what it is and not be sucked into the scaremongering about black holes."

Commenting on the impact and reception of the rap video among school-aged children, McAlpine stated "I was really hoping that this would get taken into classrooms. I don't imagine that elementary school children and most middle school children will understand it very well, but a lot of parents have e-mailed me saying 'I have a nine-year-old, or a seven-year-old, and I showed them your rap and they really love it.' So if elementary kids can get excited about it too, that's just great."

=== Black Hole Rap ===
At the end of 2009, McAlpine released a new rap video on YouTube dealing with the unfounded fears surrounding experiments in CERN that could lead to the creation of a black hole which eventually would swallow the entire earth.

=== Rare Isotope Rap ===
McAlpine released a rap video on YouTube for the Facility for Rare Isotope Beams. This video describes the basic purpose and capabilities of the facility, which was recently awarded to Michigan State University.

=== N3UROCH!P Rap ===
In 2007, McAlpine released a rap video on YouTube detailing neural programming.

== See also ==
- Les Horribles Cernettes pop group
