= Very Large Hadron Collider =

Former proposed future hadron collider planned to be located at Fermilab

The Very Large Hadron Collider (VLHC) was a proposed future hadron collider planned to be located at Fermilab. The VLHC was planned to be located in a 233 kilometres (145 mi) ring, using the Tevatron as an injector. The VLHC would run in two stages, initially the Stage-1 VLHC would have a collision energy of 40 TeV, and a luminosity of at least 1⋅10^{34} cm^{−2}⋅s^{−1} (matching or surpassing the LHC design luminosity, however the LHC has now surpassed this).

After running at Stage-1 for a period of time the VLHC was planned to run at Stage-2, with the quadrupole magnets used for bending the beam being replaced by magnets that can reach higher peak magnetic fields, allowing a collision energy of up to 175 TeV and other improvements, including raising the luminosity to at least 2⋅10^{34} cm^{−2}⋅s^{−1}.

Given that such a performance increase necessitates a correspondingly large increase in size, cost, and power requirements, a significant amount of international collaboration over a period of decades would be required to construct such a collider.

== See also ==
- Particle physics
- Superconducting Super Collider – planned ring circumference of 87.1 kilometres (54.1 mi). Canceled after 22.5 kilometres (14.0 mi) of tunnel had been bored and about US$2 billion spent.
- High Luminosity Large Hadron Collider
- Future Circular Collider
