= Circular Electron Positron Collider =

Proposed Chinese electron–positron collider

The Circular Electron Positron Collider (CEPC) is a proposed Chinese electron positron collider for experimenting on the Higgs boson. If built, it would be the world's largest particle accelerator with a circumference of 100 kilometres (62 mi).

CEPC was proposed by the Chinese Academy of Sciences' Institute of High Energy Physics in 2012. A team of international physicists produced the design, and the technical design report was released in December 2023. In 2023 the projected cost was CN¥36.4 billion, including experiments. The project was not included in China's 15th Five-Year Plan (2026 to 2030). According to Wang Yifang, the CEPC will be resubmitted in 2030 only if there is no official approval for the Future Circular Collider.

== Description ==
CEPC is projected to have a maximum center-of-mass energy of 240 GeV. It will be located 100 metres (330 ft) underground, and have two detectors. The electron-positron collisions will allow clearer observations than the proton-proton collisions of the Large Hadron Collider (LHC).

After 2040, the collider could be upgraded into the Super Proton–Proton Collider with collision energies seven times greater than the LHC.

== Physics program ==
The CEPC enables a wide physics program. As an electron-positron collider, it is suited to precision measurements, but also has strong discovery potential for new physics. Some possible physics goals include:

- Higgs measurements: Running slightly above the production threshold for ZH, the CEPC is a Higgs factory. Over the course of a ten-year run, it is planned to collect 5 ab^{−1} with two detectors, which corresponds to approximately one million produced Higgs Bosons. One target is to be able to measure the ZH production cross-section $\sigma(ZH)$ to 0.5% accuracy. Other goals include the measurement of the Higgs Boson self coupling, and its coupling to other particles.
- When running at the Z peak, a precision measurement of the Z Boson mass and other properties, e.g. the Zbb̅ coupling, can be made.
- Physics beyond the Standard Model: Despite the lower center-of-mass energy compared to the LHC, the CEPC will be able to make discoveries or exclusions in certain scenarios where the LHC cannot. A prominent situation is when there is supersymmetry, but the masses of the superpartners are very close to each other (near-degenerate). In this case, when one SUSY particle decays into another plus a Standard Model particle, the SM particle will likely escape detection in a Hadron collider. In an e+e− collider, since the initial state is completely known, it is possible to detect such events by their missing energy (the energy carried away by SUSY particles and neutrinos).

== See also ==
- Large Electron–Positron Collider – LEP was the highest energy lepton collider ever built
- Compact Linear Collider – another post-LHC linear particle accelerator planned at CERN
- International Linear Collider – another post-LHC linear particle accelerator planned in Japan
- Future Circular Collider – a proposed 100 TeV circular collider at CERN
