= Les Horribles Cernettes =

Parody pop group

- This picture of Les Horribles Cernettes was the first photographic image published on the World Wide Web in 1992. From left to right: Angela Higney, Michele de Gennaro, Colette Marx-Neilsen, Lynn Veronneau.

Background information
- Genres: Pop; doo-wop; comedy music
- Years active: 1990–2012, 2017, 2020, 2024
- Past members: Angela Higney; Michele de Gennaro; Colette Marx-Neilsen; Lynn Veronneau
- Website: https://cernettes.wixsite.com/cernettes

Les Horribles Cernettes (French pronunciation: [le.z‿ɔʁiblə sɛʁnɛt], "The Horrible CERN Girls") was an all-female parody pop group, self-labelled "the one and only High Energy Rock Band", which was founded by employees of CERN and performed at CERN and other HEP-related events. Their main claim to fame is that a photograph of them was the earliest photographic image shared on the World Wide Web.

Their musical style is often described as doo-wop. The initials of their name, LHC, are the same as those of the Large Hadron Collider, which was later built at CERN. Their humorous songs are freely available on their website.

== History ==
Les Horribles Cernettes was founded in 1990 by Michele de Gennaro, a graphic designer at CERN, whose romantic relationship with a physicist was made difficult by his shift work pattern. She attracted attention by stepping on stage during the CERN Hardronic Festival, singing "Collider", a melancholy song about the lonely nights endured by the girlfriend of a high energy physicist.

I gave you a golden ring to show you my love
You went to stick it in a printed circuit
To fix a voltage leak in your collector
You plug my feelings into your detector
You never spend your nights with me
You don't go out with other girls either
You only love your collider
Your collider.

The group was subsequently formed with the help of Silvano de Gennaro, an analyst in the Computer Science department at CERN, who wrote additional songs. The fame of Les Horribles Cernettes grew and they were invited to international Physics conferences and The World '92 Expo in Seville, as well as celebrations such as Georges Charpak's Nobel Prize party. At the same time the band self-released an album titled Collider through CD Baby and received press coverage from numerous newspapers, including The New York Times, The Herald Tribune, La Tribune de Genève, and the CERN Courier.

The band's lineup has changed over time, but they were performing under the same name until 21 July 2012, when the band had its final performance, which was at CERN's Hardronic Festival in Switzerland.

The band went into hiatus when Silvano and Michele moved away from the CERN area and officially disbanded in late July 2012, after performing at the CERN Hardronic Festival on the 21st. Lynn Veronneau has since embarked upon a serious solo career, recording French language versions of popular standards. Angela Higney also made several solo releases.

On July 15, 2017, and in celebration of their 25th anniversary (of their historic exposure on the World Wide Web), the original members performed for a one-time-only concert in Geneva.

In May 2020 the band released a new song titled "The Lockdown Song" referencing to the events of COVID-19 pandemic.

On September 17, 2024, the band performed at CERN in celebration of the organisation's 70th anniversary.

=== First photo on the Web ===
Les Cernettes is the subject of the first photo of a band and one of the first photos on the Web:

Back in 1992, after their show at the CERN Hardronic Festival, my colleague Tim Berners-Lee asked me for a few scanned photos of "the CERN girls" to publish them on some sort of information system he had just invented, called the "World Wide Web". I had only a vague idea of what that was, but I scanned some photos on my Mac and FTPed them to Tim's now famous "info.cern.ch". How was I to know that I was passing a historical milestone, as the one above was the first picture of a band ever to be clicked on in a web browser!

Silvano de Gennaro had taken the picture above on July 18, 1992 with a Canon EOS 650.

== Discography ==
=== Collider (album) ===
Collider

Studio album by Les Horribles Cernettes
- Released: 1992
- Recorded: 1990–1992
- Genres: Pop; doo-wop
- Length: 37:22
- Label: Self-released

==== Track listing ====
No.	Title	Length
1.	"Collider "	4:12
2.	"Strong Interaction "	2:57
3.	"My Sweetheart is a Nobel Prize "	3:15
4.	"Daddy's Lab "	2:33
5.	"Microwave Love "	3:36
6.	"Liquid Nitrogen "	4:58
7.	"Surfing on the Web "	3:04
8.	"Every Proton of You "	4:38
9.	"Computer Games "	3:51
10.	"Antiworld "	4:18

=== Singles ===
- "The Lockdown Song" - 2020

=== Other songs ===
The song performed at the CERN Hardronic '98 festival:

- "Goodbye Sweet CERN"

New 2007 songs presented for the first time in the CERN 2007 Hardronic festival:

- "Big Bang"
- "Mr. Higgs"

=== Music videos ===
Year	Song	Album
1992	"Collider"	Collider
1996	"Surfing on the Web"	Collider
2020	"The Lockdown Song"	Non-album single

== See also ==
- Trojan Room coffee pot
- "Large Hadron Rap" by Katherine McAlpine
- Filk music
