= Higgs factory =

Accelerator producing Higgs bosons

A Higgs factory is a particle accelerator designed to produce Higgs bosons at a very high rate, allowing precision studies of this particle. A Higgs factory was identified as the highest future priority of particle physics in the 2020 European Strategy Report. This view was reaffirmed in 2022 by the International Committee on Future Accelerators.

The Higgs boson, discovered in 2012, was the final missing particle of the Standard Model of particle physics. However, unexplained phenomena such as dark matter lead physicists to think that the Standard Model is an incomplete theory and that new particles may exist. Physicists can search for evidence of new particles in two ways. The first is through direct production, which requires sufficient energy, high production rate, and sensitive detector design. Alternatively, the search can focus on careful measurements of properties of known particles, like the Higgs, that may be affected by interactions with the new particles that are not directly observed. This second approach is the goal of a Higgs factory.

Two potential linear accelerator designs for a Higgs factory are the International Linear Collider (ILC) proposed in Japan at present and the Compact Linear Collider (CLIC) at CERN. Because the Higgs boson has a relatively light mass of 125 GeV, circular electron-positron collider designs can be applied for the construction of a Higgs factory as well. Two circular designs under consideration are the Future Circular Collider (FCC-ee) at CERN and the Circular Electron Positron Collider (CEPC) in China.

== See also ==
- B-factory
- Neutrino Factory
