= International Conference on Photonic, Electronic and Atomic Collisions =

Scientific conference

ICPEAC, the International Conference on Photonic, Electronic and Atomic Collisions (before 2000 known as the International Conference on the Physics of Electronic and Atomic Collisions), is a biennial scientific conference. It is held in late July. The first conference was held in New York City in 1958. Since then it has been held in the following locations:

#	Location	Year
I	New York, NY, United States	1958
II	Boulder, CO, United States	1961
III	London, United Kingdom	1963
IV	Quebec, QC, Canada	1965
V	Leningrad, Soviet Union	1967
VI	Cambridge, MA, United States	1969
VII	Amsterdam, Netherlands	1971
VIII	Belgrade, Yugoslavia	1973
IX	Seattle, WA, United States	1975
X	Paris, France	1977
XI	Kyoto, Japan	1979
XII	Gatlinburg, TN, United States	1981
XIII	West Berlin, West Germany	1983
XIV	Stanford, CA, United States	1985
XV	Brighton, United Kingdom	1987
XVI	New York, NY, United States	1989
XVII	Brisbane, Australia	1991
XVIII	Århus, Denmark	1993
XIX	Whistler, BC, Canada	1995
XX	Vienna, Austria	1997
XXI	Sendai, Japan	1999
XXII	Santa Fe, NM, United States	2001
XXIII	Stockholm, Sweden	2003
XXIV	Rosario, Argentina	2005
XXV	Freiburg, Germany	2007
XXVI	Kalamazoo, MI, United States	2009
XXVII	Belfast, United Kingdom	2011, 27 July - 2 August
XXVIII	Lanzhou, China	2013
XXIX	Toledo, Spain	2015, 22 – 28 July
XXX	Cairns, Queensland, Australia	2017, 26 July - 1 August
XXXI	Deauville, France	2019, 23 – 30 July
XXXII	Virtual Event	2021, 20 – 23 July
XXXIII	Ottawa, Canada	2023, 25 July – 1 August
XXXIV	Sapporo, Japan	2025, 29 July - 5 August
