= Large Hadron Collider =

Particle accelerator at CERN, Switzerland

Large Hadron Collider (LHC)
- Layout of the LHC complex

General properties
- Accelerator type: Synchrotron
- Beam type: Proton, heavy ion
- Target type: Collider

Beam properties
- Maximum energy: 6.8 TeV per beam (13.6 TeV collision energy)
- Maximum luminosity: 1×10^{34}/(cm^{2}⋅s)

Physical properties
- Circumference: 26,659 metres (16.565 miles)
- Location: Near Geneva, Switzerland; across the border of France and Switzerland
- Coordinates: 46°14′06″N 06°02′42″E
- Institution: CERN
- Dates of operation: 2010; 16 years ago – present
- Preceded by: Large Electron–Positron Collider

Large Hadron Collider (LHC)
- Plan of the LHC experiments and the preaccelerators

LHC experiments
- ATLAS: A Toroidal LHC Apparatus
- CMS: Compact Muon Solenoid
- LHCb: LHC-beauty
- ALICE: A Large Ion Collider Experiment
- TOTEM: Total Cross Section, Elastic Scattering and Diffraction Dissociation
- LHCf: LHC-forward
- MoEDAL: Monopole and Exotics Detector At the LHC
- FASER: ForwArd Search ExpeRiment
- SND: Scattering and Neutrino Detector

LHC preaccelerators
- p and Pb: Linear accelerators for protons (Linac 4) and lead (Linac 3)
- (not marked): Proton Synchrotron Booster
- PS: Proton Synchrotron
- SPS: Super Proton Synchrotron

CERN Complex

Current particle and nuclear facilities
- LHC: Accelerates protons and heavy ions
- LEIR: Accelerates ions
- SPS: Accelerates protons and ions
- PSB: Accelerates protons
- PS: Accelerates protons or ions
- Linac 3: Injects heavy ions into LEIR
- Linac4: Accelerates ions
- AD: Decelerates antiprotons
- ELENA: Decelerates antiprotons
- ISOLDE: Produces radioactive ion beams
- MEDICIS: Produces isotopes for medical purposes

The Large Hadron Collider (LHC) is the world's largest and highest-energy particle accelerator as of 2026. It was built by the European Organization for Nuclear Research (CERN) between 1998 and 2008, in collaboration with over 10,000 scientists, and hundreds of universities and laboratories across more than 100 countries. It lies in a tunnel approximately 27 kilometres (17 mi) in circumference and as deep as 175 metres (574 ft) beneath the France–Switzerland border near Geneva.

The first collisions were achieved in 2010 at an energy of 3.5 tera-electronvolts (TeV) per beam, about four times the previous world record. The discovery of the Higgs boson at the LHC was announced in 2012. Between 2013 and 2015, the LHC was shut down and upgraded; after those upgrades it reached 6.5 TeV per beam (13.0 TeV total collision energy). At the end of 2018, it was shut down for maintenance and further upgrades, and reopened over three years later in April 2022.

The collider has four crossing points where the accelerated particles collide. Nine detectors, each designed to detect different phenomena, are positioned around the crossing points. The LHC primarily collides proton beams, but it can also accelerate beams of heavy ions, such as in lead–lead collisions and proton–lead collisions.

The LHC's goal is to allow physicists to test the predictions of different theories of particle physics, including measuring the properties of the Higgs boson, searching for the large family of new particles predicted by supersymmetric theories, and studying other unresolved questions in particle physics.

== Background ==
The term hadron refers to subatomic composite particles composed of quarks held together by the strong force (analogous to the way that atoms and molecules are held together by the electromagnetic force). The best-known hadrons are the baryons such as protons and neutrons; hadrons also include mesons such as the pion and kaon, which were discovered during cosmic ray experiments in the late 1940s and early 1950s.

A collider is a type of a particle accelerator that two opposing particle beams together such that the particles collide. In particle physics, colliders, though harder to construct, are a powerful research tool because they reach a much higher center of mass energy than fixed target setups. Analysis of the byproducts of these collisions gives scientists good evidence of the structure of the subatomic world and the laws of nature governing it. Many of these byproducts are produced only by high-energy collisions, and they decay after very short periods of time. Thus many of them are hard or nearly impossible to study in other ways.

== Purpose ==
Many physicists hope that the Large Hadron Collider will help answer some of the fundamental open questions in physics, which concern the basic laws governing the interactions and forces among elementary particles and the deep structure of space and time, particularly the interrelation between quantum mechanics and general relativity.

These high-energy particle experiments can provide data to support different scientific models. For example, the Standard Model and Higgsless model required high-energy particle experiment data to validate their predictions and allow further theoretical development. The Standard Model was completed by detection of the Higgs boson by the LHC in 2012.

LHC collisions have explored other questions, including:

- Do all known particles have supersymmetric partners, as part of supersymmetry in an extension of the Standard Model and Poincaré symmetry?
- Are there extra dimensions, as predicted by various models based on string theory, and can we detect them?
- What is the nature of the dark matter, a hypothetical form of matter which appears to account for 27% of the mass-energy of the universe?

Other open questions that may be explored using high-energy particle collisions include:

- It is already known that electromagnetism and the weak nuclear force are different manifestations of a single force called the electroweak force. The LHC may clarify whether the electroweak force and the strong nuclear force are similarly just different manifestations of one universal unified force, as predicted by various Grand Unification Theories.
- Why is the fourth fundamental force (gravity) so many orders of magnitude weaker than the other three fundamental forces? See also Hierarchy problem.
- Are there additional sources of quark flavour mixing beyond those already present within the Standard Model?
- Why are there apparent violations of the symmetry between matter and antimatter? See also CP violation.
- What are the nature and properties of quark–gluon plasma, thought to have existed in the early universe and in certain compact and strange astronomical objects today? This will be investigated by heavy ion collisions, mainly in ALICE, but also in CMS, ATLAS and LHCb. First observed in 2010, findings published in 2012 confirmed the phenomenon of jet quenching in heavy-ion collisions.

== Design ==
The collider is contained in a circular tunnel, with a circumference of 26.7 kilometres (16.6 mi), at a depth ranging from 50 to 175 metres (164 to 574 ft) underground. The variation in depth was deliberate, to reduce the amount of tunnel that lies under the Jura Mountains to avoid having to excavate a vertical access shaft there. A tunnel was chosen to avoid having to purchase expensive land on the surface and to take advantage of the shielding against background radiation that the Earth's crust provides.

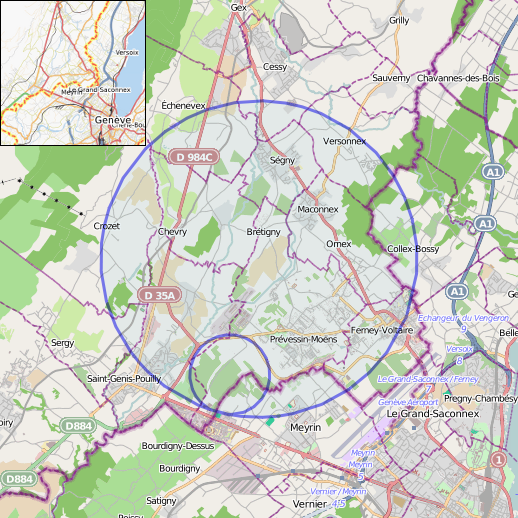
Map of the Large Hadron Collider at CERN

The 3.8-metre-wide (12 ft) concrete-lined tunnel, constructed between 1983 and 1988, was formerly used to house the Large Electron–Positron Collider. The tunnel crosses the border between Switzerland and France at four points, with most of it in France. Surface buildings hold ancillary equipment such as compressors, ventilation equipment, control electronics and refrigeration plants.

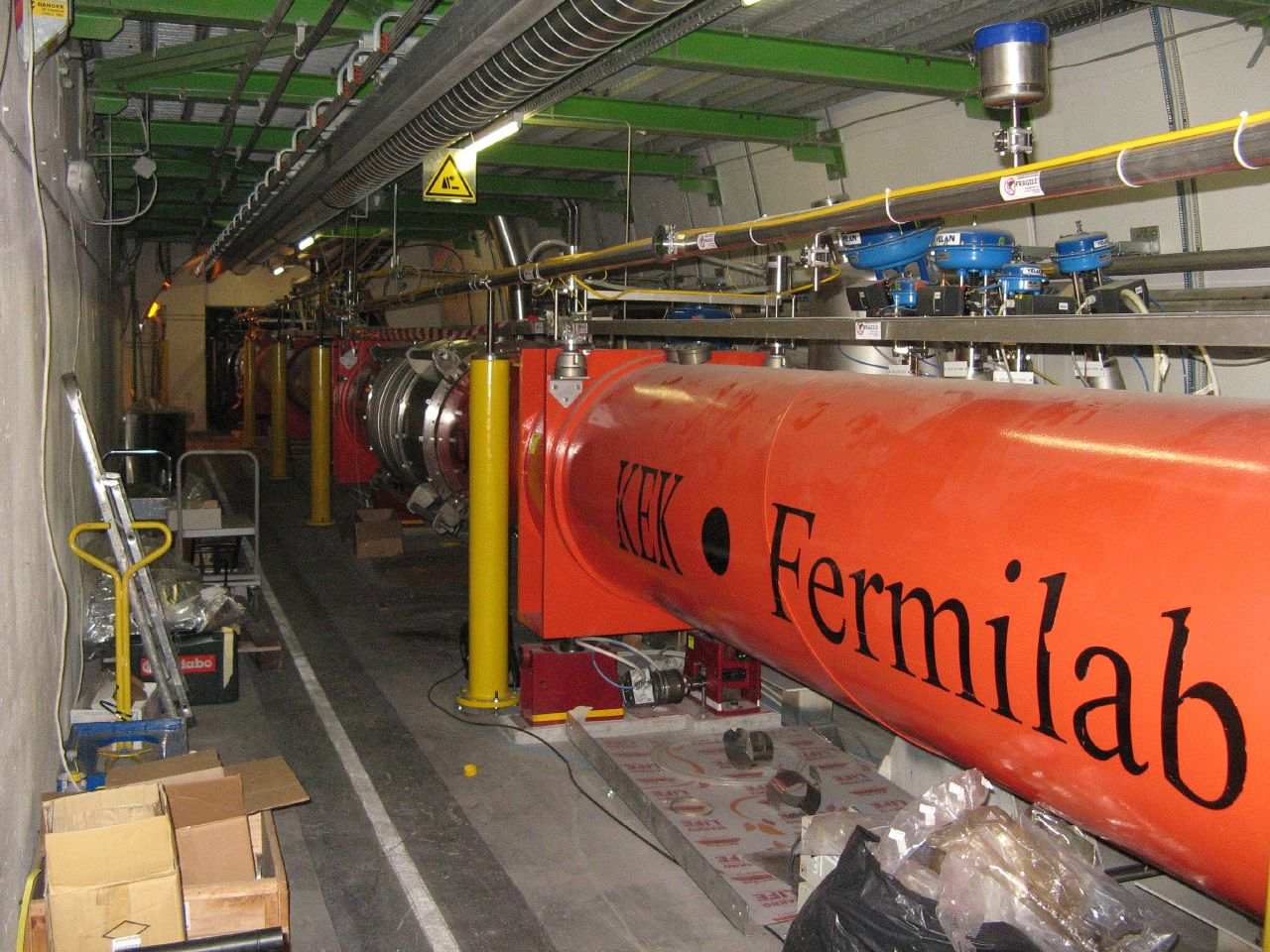
Superconducting quadrupole electromagnets are used to direct the beams to four intersection points, where interactions between accelerated protons take place.

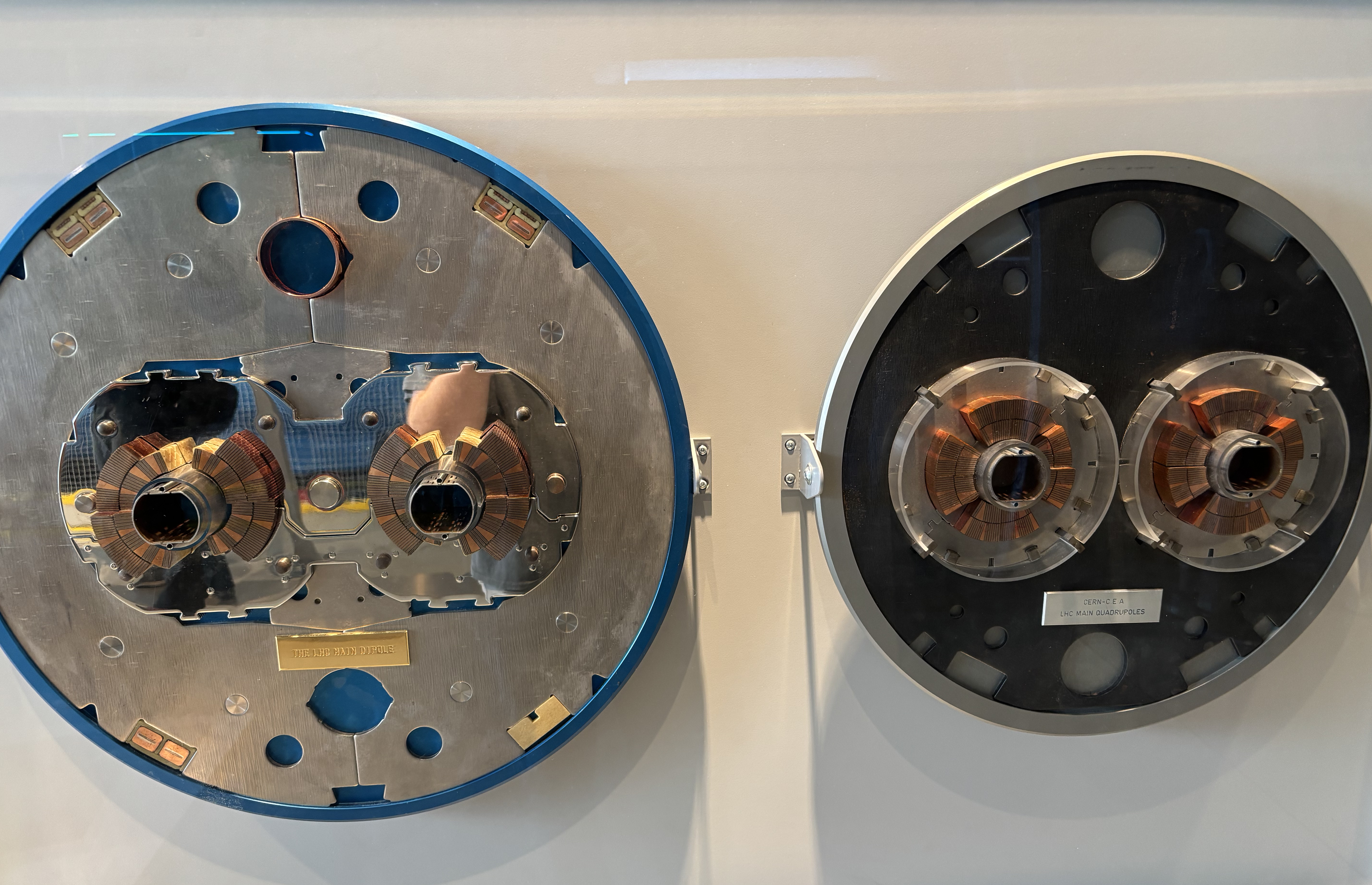
LHC magnet cross sections, left is a dipole magnet segment and right is a quadrupole magnet segment.

The collider tunnel contains two adjacent parallel beamlines (or beam pipes) each containing a beam, which travel in opposite directions around the ring. The beams intersect at four points around the ring, which is where the particle collisions take place. Some 1,232 dipole magnets keep the beams on their circular path (see image), while an additional 392 quadrupole magnets are used to keep the beams focused, with stronger quadrupole magnets close to the intersection points in order to maximize the chances of interaction where the two beams cross. Magnets of higher multipole orders are used to correct smaller imperfections in the field geometry. In total, about 10,000 superconducting magnets are installed, with each of the 1,232 dipole magnets having a mass of 35 tonnes. About 96 tonnes of superfluid helium-4 is needed to keep the magnets, made of copper-clad niobium-titanium, at their operating temperature of 1.9 K (−271.25 °C), making the LHC the largest cryogenic facility in the world at liquid helium temperature. LHC uses 470 tonnes of Nb–Ti superconductor.

During LHC operations, the CERN site draws roughly 200 MW of electrical power from the French electrical grid, which, for comparison, is about one-third the energy consumption of the city of Geneva; the LHC accelerator and detectors draw about 120 MW thereof. Each day of its operation generates 140 terabytes of data.

When running an energy of 6.5 TeV per proton, once or twice a day, as the protons are accelerated from 450 GeV to 6.5 TeV, the field of the superconducting dipole magnets is increased from 0.54 to 7.7 teslas (T). The protons each have an energy of 6.5 TeV, giving a total collision energy of 13 TeV. At this energy, the protons have a Lorentz factor of about 6,930 and move at about 0.999999990 c, or about 3.1 m/s (11 km/h) slower than the speed of light (c). It takes less than 90 microseconds (μs) for a proton to travel 26.7 km around the main ring. This results in 11,245 revolutions per second for protons whether the particles are at low or high energy in the main ring, since the speed difference between these energies is beyond the fifth decimal.

Rather than having continuous beams, the protons are bunched together, into up to 2,808 bunches, with 115 billion protons in each bunch so that interactions between the two beams take place at discrete intervals, mainly 25 nanoseconds (ns) apart, providing a bunch collision rate of 40 MHz. It was operated with fewer bunches in the first years. The design luminosity of the LHC is 10^{34} cm^{−2}s^{−1}, which was first reached in June 2016. By 2017, twice this value was achieved.

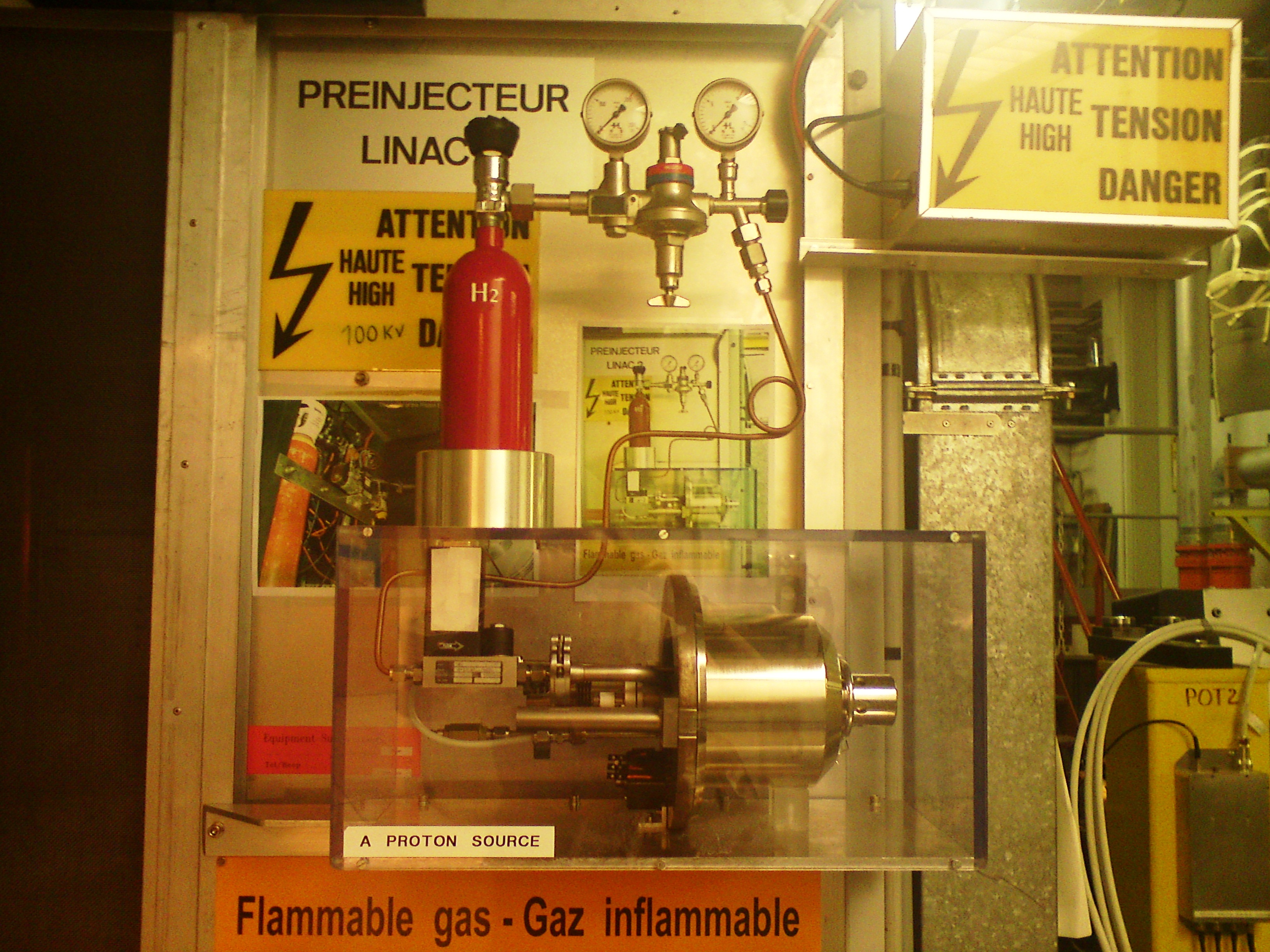
The LHC protons originate from the small red hydrogen tank.

Before being injected into the main accelerator, the particles are prepared by a series of systems that successively increase their energy. The first system is the linear particle accelerator Linac4 generating 160 MeV negative hydrogen ions (H^{−} ions), which feeds the Proton Synchrotron Booster (PSB). There, both electrons are stripped from the hydrogen ions leaving only the nucleus, being one proton. These protons are then accelerated to 2 GeV and injected into the Proton Synchrotron (PS), where they are accelerated to 26 GeV. Finally, the Super Proton Synchrotron (SPS) is used to increase their energy further to 450 GeV before they are at last injected (over a period of several minutes) into the main ring. Here, the proton bunches are accumulated, accelerated (over a period of 20 minutes) to their peak energy, and finally circulated for 5 to 24 hours while collisions occur at the four intersection points.

The LHC physics programme is mainly based on proton–proton collisions. However, during shorter running periods, typically one month per year, heavy-ion collisions are included in the programme. While lighter ions are considered as well, the baseline scheme deals with lead ions (see ALICE experiment). The lead ions are first accelerated by the linear accelerator LINAC 3, and the Low Energy Ion Ring (LEIR) is used as an ion storage and cooler unit. The ions are then further accelerated by the PS and SPS before being injected into LHC ring, where they reach an energy of 2.3 TeV per nucleon (or 522 TeV per ion), higher than the energies reached by the Relativistic Heavy Ion Collider. The aim of the heavy-ion programme is to investigate quark–gluon plasma, which existed in the early universe.

=== Detectors ===
Nine detectors have been built in large caverns excavated at the LHC's intersection points. Two of them, the ATLAS experiment and the Compact Muon Solenoid (CMS), are large general-purpose particle detectors. ALICE and LHCb have more specialized roles, while the other five—TOTEM, MoEDAL, LHCf, SND and FASER—are much smaller and are for very specialized research. The ATLAS and CMS experiments discovered the Higgs boson, which is strong evidence that the Standard Model has the correct mechanism of giving mass to elementary particles.

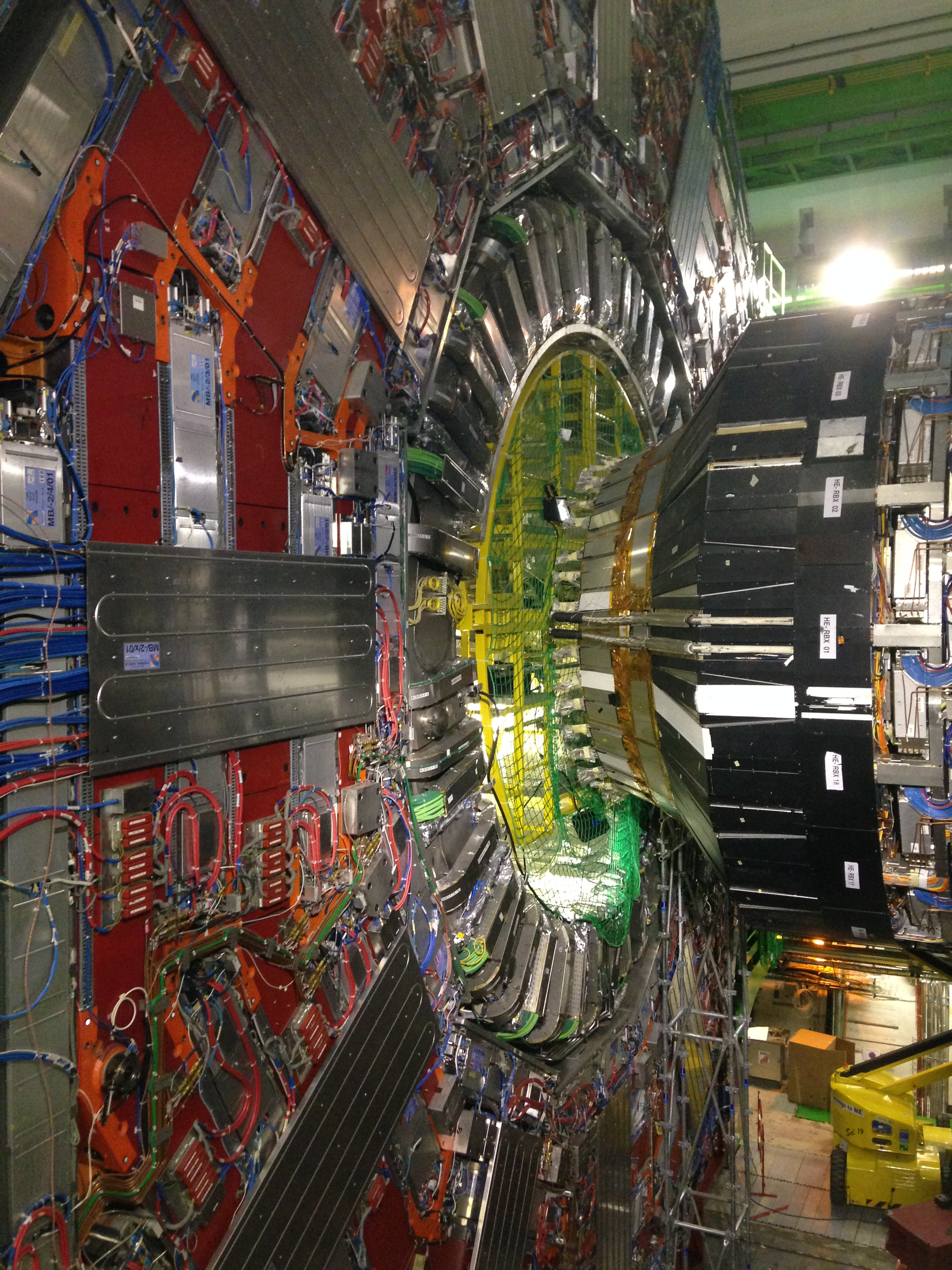
CMS detector for LHC

=== Computing and analysis facilities ===
Data produced by LHC, as well as LHC-related simulation, were estimated at 200 petabytes per year.

The LHC Computing Grid was constructed as part of the LHC design, to handle the large amounts of data expected for its collisions. It is an international collaborative project that consists of a grid-based computer network infrastructure initially connecting 140 computing centres in 35 countries (over 170 in more than 40 countries as of 2012). It was designed by CERN to handle the significant volume of data produced by LHC experiments, incorporating both private fibre optic cable links and existing high-speed portions of the public Internet to enable data transfer from CERN to academic institutions around the world. The LHC Computing Grid consists of global federations across Europe, Asia Pacific and the Americas.

The distributed computing project LHC@home was started to support the construction and calibration of the LHC. The project uses the BOINC platform, enabling anybody with an Internet connection and a computer running Mac OS X, Windows or Linux to use their computer's idle time to simulate how particles will travel in the beam pipes. With this information, the scientists are able to determine how the magnets should be calibrated to gain the most stable "orbit" of the beams in the ring. In August 2011, a second application (Test4Theory) went live which performs simulations against which to compare actual test data, to determine confidence levels of the results.

By 2012, data from over 6 quadrillion (6×10^{15}) LHC proton–proton collisions had been analysed. The LHC Computing Grid had become the world's largest computing grid in 2012, comprising over 170 computing facilities in a worldwide network across more than 40 countries.

== Operational history ==
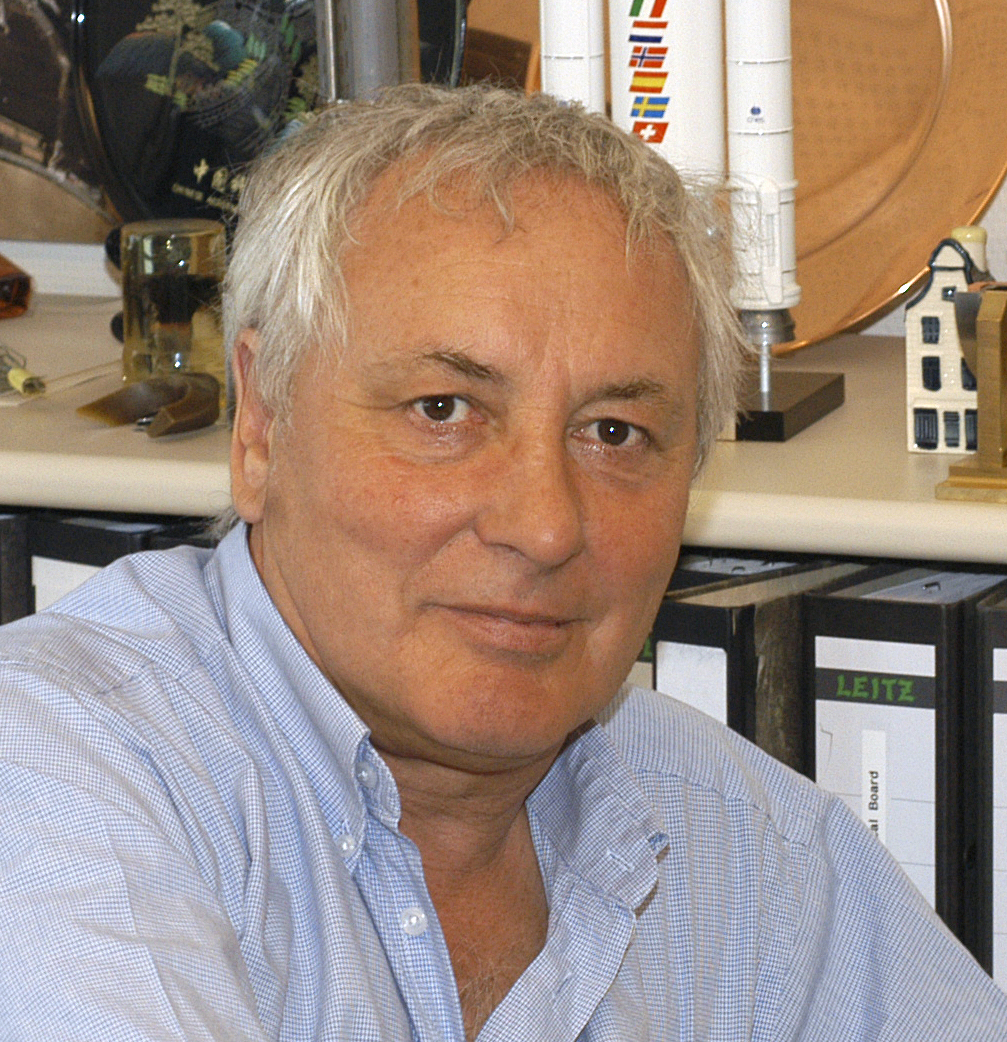
Lyn Evans, the project leader of the Large Hadron Collider

The LHC first went operational on 10 September 2008, but initial testing was delayed for 14 months from 19 September 2008 to 20 November 2009, following a magnet quench incident that caused extensive damage to over 50 superconducting magnets, their mountings, and the vacuum pipe.

During its first run (2010–2013), the LHC collided two opposing particle beams of either protons at up to 4 teraelectronvolts (4 TeV or 0.64 microjoules), or lead nuclei (574 TeV per nucleus, or 2.76 TeV per nucleon). Its first run discoveries included the long-sought Higgs boson, several composite particles (hadrons) like the χ_{b} (3P) bottomonium state, the first creation of a quark–gluon plasma, and the first observations of the very rare decay of the B_{s} meson into two muons (B_{s}^{0} → μ^{+}μ^{−}), which challenged the validity of existing models of supersymmetry.

=== Construction ===
==== Operational challenges ====
The size of the LHC constitutes an engineering challenge with operational issues on account of the amount of energy stored in the magnets and the beams. While operating, the total energy stored in the magnets is 10 GJ (2,400 kilograms of TNT) and the total energy carried by the two beams reaches 724 MJ (173 kilograms of TNT).

Loss of only one ten-millionth part (10^{−7}) of the beam is sufficient to quench a superconducting magnet, while each of the two beam dumps must absorb 362 MJ (87 kilograms of TNT). These energies are carried by very little matter: under nominal operating conditions (2,808 bunches per beam, 1.15×10^{11} protons per bunch), the beam pipes contain 1.0×10^{−9} gram of hydrogen, which, in standard conditions for temperature and pressure, would fill the volume of one grain of fine sand.

==== Cost ====
With a budget of €7.5 billion (about $9 billion or £6.19 billion as of June 2010), the LHC is one of the most expensive scientific instruments ever built. The total cost of the project is expected to be approximately 4.6 billion Swiss francs (SFr) (about $4.4 billion, €3.1 billion, or £2.8 billion as of January 2010) for the accelerator and 1.16 billion (SFr) (about $1.1 billion, €0.8 billion, or £0.7 billion as of January 2010) for the CERN contribution to the experiments.

The construction of LHC was approved in 1995 with a budget of SFr 2.6 billion, with another SFr 210M for the experiments. However, cost overruns, estimated in a major review in 2001 at around SFr 480M for the accelerator and SFr 50M for the experiments, along with a reduction in CERN's budget, pushed the completion date from 2005 to April 2007. The superconducting magnets were responsible for SFr 180M of the cost increase. There were also further costs and delays owing to engineering difficulties encountered while building the cavern for the Compact Muon Solenoid, to magnet supports that were insufficiently strongly designed and failed their initial testing (2007), and to damage from a magnet quench and liquid helium escape (inaugural testing, 2008). Because electricity costs are lower during the summer, the LHC normally does not operate over the winter months, although exceptions over the 2009/10 and 2012/2013 winters were made to make up for the 2008 start-up delays and to improve precision of measurements of the new particle discovered in 2012, respectively.

==== Construction accidents and delays ====
- On 25 October 2005, José Pereira Lages, a technician, was killed in the LHC when a switchgear that was being transported fell on top of him.
- On 27 March 2007, a cryogenic magnet support designed and provided by Fermilab and KEK broke during an initial pressure test involving one of the LHC's inner triplet (focusing quadrupole) magnet assemblies. No one was injured. Fermilab director Pier Oddone stated "In this case we are dumbfounded that we missed some very simple balance of forces". The fault had been present in the original design, and remained during four engineering reviews over the following years. Analysis revealed that its design, made as thin as possible for better insulation, was not strong enough to withstand the forces generated during pressure testing. Details are available in a statement from Fermilab, with which CERN is in agreement. Repairing the broken magnet and reinforcing the eight identical assemblies used by LHC delayed the start-up date, then planned for November 2007.
- On 19 September 2008, during initial testing, a faulty electrical connection led to a magnet quench (the sudden loss of a superconducting magnet's superconducting ability owing to warming or electric field effects). Six tonnes of supercooled liquid helium—used to cool the magnets—escaped, with sufficient force to break 10-ton magnets nearby from their mountings, and caused considerable damage and contamination of the vacuum tube. Repairs and safety checks caused a delay of around 14 months.
- Two vacuum leaks were found in July 2009, and the start of operations was further postponed to mid-November 2009.

==== Exclusion of Russia ====
With the 2022 Russian invasion of Ukraine, the participation of Russians with CERN was called into question. About 8% of the workforce are of Russian nationality. In June 2022, CERN said the governing council "intends to terminate" CERN's cooperation agreements with Belarus and Russia when they expire, respectively, in June and December 2024. CERN said it would monitor developments in Ukraine and remains prepared to take additional steps as warranted. CERN further said that it would reduce the Ukrainian contribution to CERN for 2022 to the amount already remitted to the Organization, thereby waiving the second installment of the contribution.

==== Initial lower magnet currents ====
In both of its runs (2010 to 2012 and 2015), the LHC was initially run at energies below its planned operating energy, and ramped up to just 2 × 4 TeV energy on its first run and 2 × 6.5 TeV on its second run, below the design energy of 2 × 7 TeV. This is because massive superconducting magnets require considerable magnet training to handle the high currents involved without losing their superconducting ability, and the high currents are necessary to allow a high proton energy. The "training" process involves repeatedly running the magnets with lower currents to provoke any quenches or minute movements that may result. It also takes time to cool down magnets to their operating temperature of around 1.9 K (close to absolute zero). Over time the magnet "beds in" and ceases to quench at these lesser currents and can handle the full design current without quenching; CERN media describe the magnets as "shaking out" the unavoidable tiny manufacturing imperfections in their crystals and positions that had initially impaired their ability to handle their planned currents. The magnets, over time and with training, gradually become able to handle their full planned currents without quenching.

=== Inaugural tests (2008) ===
The first beam was circulated through the collider on the morning of 10 September 2008. CERN successfully fired the protons around the tunnel in stages, three kilometres at a time. The particles were fired in a clockwise direction into the accelerator and successfully steered around it at 10:28 local time. The LHC successfully completed its major test: after a series of trial runs, two white dots flashed on a computer screen showing the protons travelled the full length of the collider. It took less than one hour to guide the stream of particles around its inaugural circuit. CERN next successfully sent a beam of protons in an anticlockwise direction, taking slightly longer at one and a half hours owing to a problem with the cryogenics, with the full circuit being completed at 14:59.

==== Quench incident ====
On 19 September 2008, a magnet quench occurred in about 100 bending magnets in sectors 3 and 4, where an electrical fault vented about six tonnes of liquid helium (the magnets' cryogenic coolant) into the tunnel. The escaping vapour expanded with explosive force, damaging 53 superconducting magnets and their mountings, and contaminating the vacuum pipe, which also lost vacuum conditions.

Shortly after this incident, CERN reported that the most likely cause of the problem was a faulty electrical connection between two magnets. It estimated that repairs would take at least two months, owing to the time needed to warm up the affected sectors and then cool them back down to operating temperature. CERN released an interim technical report and preliminary analysis of the incident on 15 and 16 October 2008 respectively, and a more detailed report on 5 December 2008. The analysis of the incident by CERN confirmed that an electrical fault had indeed been the cause. The faulty electrical connection had led (correctly) to a failsafe power abort of the electrical systems powering the superconducting magnets, but had also caused an electric arc (or discharge) which damaged the integrity of the supercooled helium's enclosure and vacuum insulation, causing the coolant's temperature and pressure to rapidly rise beyond the ability of the safety systems to contain it, and leading to a temperature rise of about 100 degrees Celsius in some of the affected magnets. Energy stored in the superconducting magnets and electrical noise induced in other quench detectors also played a role in the rapid heating. Around two tonnes of liquid helium escaped explosively before detectors triggered an emergency stop, and a further four tonnes leaked at lower pressure in the aftermath. A total of 53 magnets were damaged in the incident and were repaired or replaced during the winter shutdown. This accident was thoroughly discussed in a 22 February 2010 Superconductor Science and Technology article by CERN physicist Lucio Rossi.

In the original schedule for LHC commissioning, the first "modest" high-energy collisions at a centre-of-mass energy of 900 GeV were expected to take place before the end of September 2008, and the LHC was expected to be operating at 10 TeV by the end of 2008. However, owing to the delay caused by the incident, the collider was not operational until November 2009. Despite the delay, LHC was officially inaugurated on 21 October 2008, in the presence of political leaders, science ministers from CERN's 20 Member States, CERN officials, and members of the worldwide scientific community.

Most of 2009 was spent on repairs and reviews from the damage caused by the quench incident, along with two further vacuum leaks identified in July 2009; this pushed the start of operations to November of that year.

=== Run 1: first operational run (2009–2013) ===
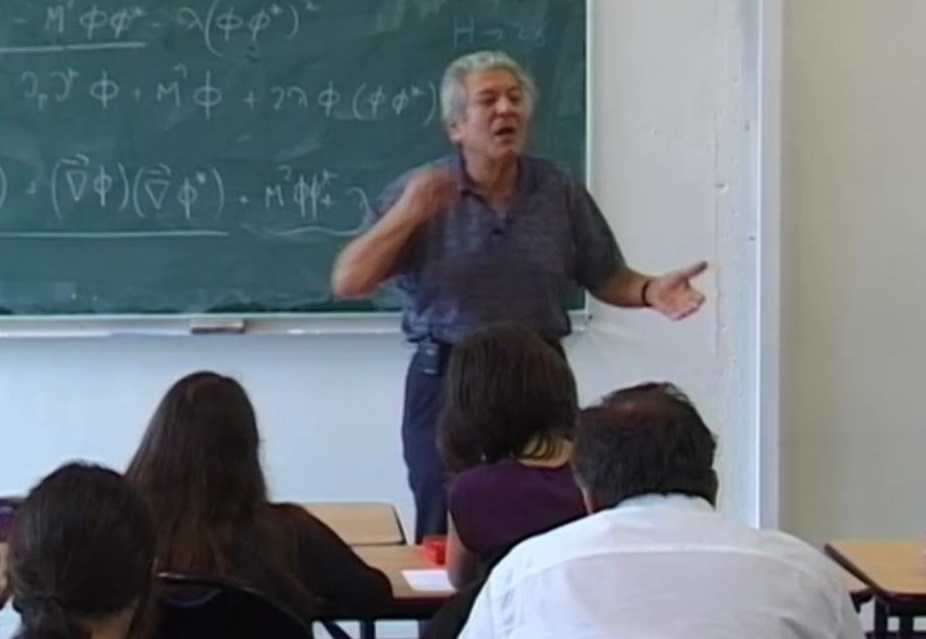
Seminar on the physics of LHC by John Iliopoulos (2009)

On 20 November 2009, low-energy beams circulated in the tunnel for the first time since the incident, and shortly after, on 30 November, the LHC achieved 1.18 TeV per beam to become the world's highest-energy particle accelerator, beating the Tevatron's previous record of 0.98 TeV per beam held for eight years.

The early part of 2010 saw the continued ramp-up of beam in energies and early physics experiments towards 3.5 TeV per beam and on 30 March 2010, LHC set a new record for high-energy collisions by colliding proton beams at a combined energy level of 7 TeV. The attempt was the third that day, after two unsuccessful attempts in which the protons had to be "dumped" from the collider and new beams had to be injected. This also marked the start of the main research programme.

The first proton run ended on 4 November 2010. A run with lead ions started on 8 November 2010, and ended on 6 December 2010, allowing the ALICE experiment to study matter under extreme conditions similar to those shortly after the Big Bang.

CERN originally planned that the LHC would run through to the end of 2012, with a short break at the end of 2011 to allow for an increase in beam energy from 3.5 to 4 TeV per beam. At the end of 2012, the LHC was planned to be temporarily shut down until around 2015 to allow upgrade to a planned beam energy of 7 TeV per beam. In late 2012, in light of the July 2012 discovery of the Higgs boson, the shutdown was postponed for some weeks into early 2013, to allow additional data to be obtained before shutdown.

=== Long Shutdown 1 (2013–2015) ===
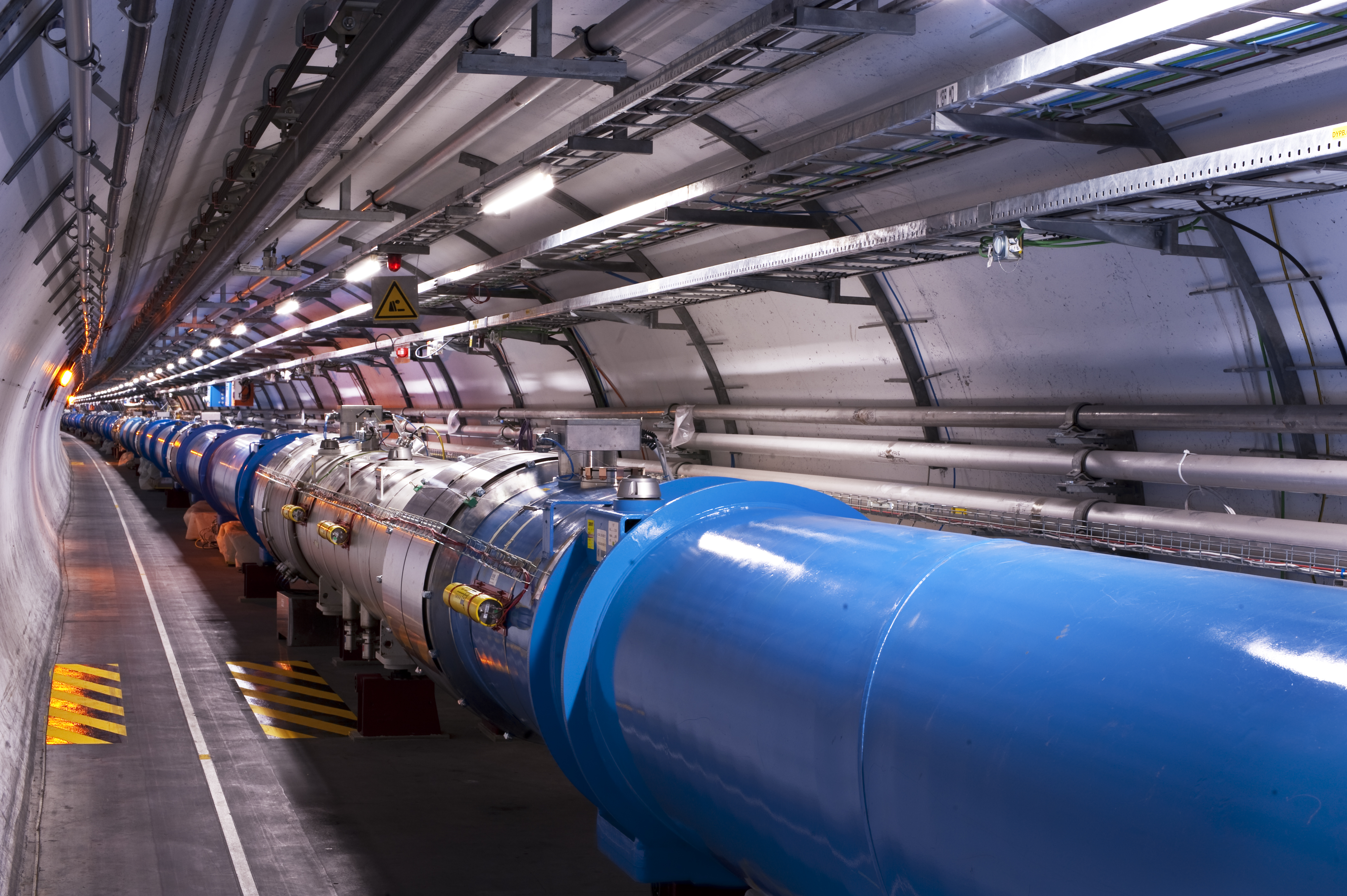
A section of the LHC tunnel. The dipole magnets are painted in a blue colour, to protect them from rust.

The LHC was shut down on 13 February 2013 for its two-year upgrade called Long Shutdown 1 (LS1), which was to touch on many aspects of the LHC: enabling collisions at 14 TeV, enhancing its detectors and pre-accelerators (the Proton Synchrotron and Super Proton Synchrotron), as well as replacing its ventilation system and 100 km (62 mi) of cabling impaired by high-energy collisions from its first run. The upgraded collider began its long start-up and testing process in June 2014, with the Proton Synchrotron Booster starting on 2 June 2014, the final interconnection between magnets completing and the Proton Synchrotron circulating particles on 18 June 2014, and the first section of the main LHC supermagnet system reaching operating temperature of 1.9 K (−271.25 °C), a few days later. Due to the slow progress with "training" the superconducting magnets, it was decided to start the second run with a lower energy of 6.5 TeV per beam, corresponding to a current in the magnet of 11,000 amperes. The first of the main LHC magnets were reported to have been successfully trained by 9 December 2014, while training the other magnet sectors was finished in March 2015.

=== Run 2: second operational run (2015–2018) ===
On 5 April 2015, the LHC restarted after a two-year break, during which the electrical connectors between the bending magnets were upgraded to safely handle the current required for 7 TeV per beam (14 TeV collision energy). However, the bending magnets were only trained to handle up to 6.5 TeV per beam (13 TeV collision energy), which became the operating energy for 2015 to 2018. The energy was first reached on 10 April 2015. The upgrades culminated in colliding protons together with a combined energy of 13 TeV. On 3 June 2015, the LHC started delivering physics data after almost two years offline. In the following months, it was used for proton–proton collisions, while in November, the machine switched to collisions of lead ions and in December, the usual winter shutdown started.

In 2016, the machine operators focused on increasing the luminosity for proton–proton collisions. The design value was first reached 29 June, and further improvements increased the collision rate to 40% above the design value. The total number of collisions in 2016 exceeded the number from Run 1—at a higher energy per collision. The proton–proton run was followed by four weeks of proton–lead collisions.

In 2017, the luminosity was increased further and reached twice the design value. The total number of collisions was higher than in 2016 as well.

The 2018 physics run began on 17 April and stopped on 3 December, including four weeks of lead–lead collisions.

=== Long Shutdown 2 (2018–2022) ===
Long Shutdown 2 (LS2) started on 10 December 2018. The LHC and the whole CERN accelerator complex was maintained and upgraded. The goal of the upgrades was to implement the High Luminosity Large Hadron Collider (HL-LHC) project that will increase the luminosity by a factor of 10. LS2 ended in April 2022. The Long Shutdown 3 (LS3) in the 2020s will take place before the HL-LHC project is done.

=== Run 3: third operational run (2022) ===
LHC became operational again on 22 April 2022 with a new maximum beam energy of 6.8 TeV (13.6 TeV collision energy), which was first achieved on 25 April. It officially commenced its run 3 physics season on 5 July 2022. This round continued until 2026. In addition to a higher energy the LHC is expected to reach a higher luminosity, which is expected to increase even further with the upgrade to the HL-LHC after Run 3.

=== Long Shutdown 3 (2026–2030) ===
Long Shutdown 3 (LS3) started in June 2026. LS3 will mark the most important intervention since the construction of the LHC. This involves the consolidation of the Super Proton Synchrotron (SPS) North Area, the dismantling of the CERN Neutrinos to Gran Sasso (CNGS) target area, the transformation of the Experimental Cavern North 3 (ECN3) into a high-intensity fixed-target facility, the renovation of the ISOLDE facility and various other works relating to consolidation, installation, maintenance and upgrades. The accelerator will gradually restart beginning in 2028 in order for HL-LHC to become operational in the 2030s.

== Timeline of operations ==
Date	Event
10 Sep 2008	CERN successfully fired the first protons around the entire tunnel circuit in stages.
19 Sep 2008	Magnetic quench occurred in about 100 bending magnets in sectors 3 and 4, causing a loss of about 6 tonnes of liquid helium.
30 Sep 2008	First "modest" high-energy collisions planned but postponed due to accident.
16 Oct 2008	CERN released a preliminary analysis of the accident.
21 Oct 2008	Official inauguration.
5 Dec 2008	CERN released detailed analysis.
20 Nov 2009	Low-energy beams circulated in the tunnel for the first time since the accident.
23 Nov 2009	First particle collisions in all four detectors at 450 GeV.
30 Nov 2009	LHC becomes the world's highest-energy particle accelerator achieving 1.18 TeV per beam, beating the Tevatron's previous record of 0.98 TeV per beam held for eight years.
15 Dec 2009	First scientific results, covering 284 collisions in the ALICE detector.
30 Mar 2010	The two beams collided at 7 TeV (3.5 TeV per beam) in the LHC at 13:06 CEST, marking the start of the LHC research programme.
8 Nov 2010	Start of the first run with lead ions.
6 Dec 2010	End of the run with lead ions. Shutdown until early 2011.
13 Mar 2011	Beginning of the 2011 run with proton beams.
21 Apr 2011	LHC becomes the world's highest-luminosity hadron accelerator achieving a peak luminosity of 4.67·10^{32} cm^{−2}s^{−1}, beating the Tevatron's previous record of 4·10^{32} cm^{−2}s^{−1} held for one year.
24 May 2011	ALICE reports that a Quark–gluon plasma has been achieved with earlier lead collisions.
17 Jun 2011	The high-luminosity experiments ATLAS and CMS reach 1 fb^{−1} of collected data.
14 Oct 2011	LHCb reaches 1 fb^{−1} of collected data.
23 Oct 2011	The high-luminosity experiments ATLAS and CMS reach 5 fb^{−1} of collected data.
Nov 2011	Second run with lead ions.
22 Dec 2011	First new composite particle discovery, the χ_{b} (3P) bottomonium meson, observed with proton–proton collisions in 2011.
5 Apr 2012	First collisions with stable beams in 2012 after the winter shutdown. The energy is increased to 4 TeV per beam (8 TeV in collisions).
4 Jul 2012	First new elementary particle discovery, a new boson observed that is "consistent with" the theorized Higgs boson. (This has now been confirmed as the Higgs boson itself.)
8 Nov 2012	First observation of the very rare decay of the B_{s} meson into two muons (B_{s}^{0} → μ^{+}μ^{−}), a major test of supersymmetry theories, shows results at 3.5 sigma that match the Standard Model rather than many of its super-symmetrical variants.
20 Jan 2013	Start of the first run colliding protons with lead ions.
11 Feb 2013	End of the first run colliding protons with lead ions.
14 Feb 2013	Beginning of the first long shutdown to prepare the collider for a higher energy and luminosity.
Long Shutdown 1
7 Mar 2015	Injection tests for Run 2 send protons towards LHCb & ALICE
5 Apr 2015	Both beams circulated in the collider. Four days later, a new record energy of 6.5 TeV per proton was achieved.
20 May 2015	Protons collided in the LHC at the record-breaking collision energy of 13 TeV.
3 Jun 2015	Start of delivering the physics data after almost two years offline for recommissioning.
4 Nov 2015	End of proton collisions in 2015, start of preparations for ion collisions.
Nov 2015	Ion collisions at a record-breaking energy of more than 1 PeV (10^{15} eV)
13 Dec 2015	End of ion collisions in 2015
23 Apr 2016	Data-taking in 2016 begins
29 June 2016	The LHC achieves a luminosity of 1.0 · 10^{34} cm^{−2}s^{−1}, its design value. Further improvements over the year increased the luminosity to 40% above the design value.
26 Oct 2016	End of 2016 proton–proton collisions
10 Nov 2016	Beginning of 2016 proton–lead collisions
3 Dec 2016	End of 2016 proton–lead collisions
24 May 2017	Start of 2017 proton–proton collisions. During 2017, the luminosity increased to twice its design value.
10 Nov 2017	End of regular 2017 proton–proton collision mode.
17 Apr 2018	Start of 2018 proton–proton collisions.
12 Nov 2018	End of 2018 proton operations at CERN.
3 Dec 2018	End of 2018 lead-ion run.
10 Dec 2018	End of 2018 physics operation and start of Long Shutdown 2.
Long Shutdown 2
22 Apr 2022	LHC becomes operational again.
20 Mar 2023	For the first time in 5 years, scientists observe lead ions.
5 Apr 2024	LHC reaches its first stable beams in 2024.
16 Oct 2024	End of 2024 proton operations at CERN, with 11% more collisions than planned.
23 Nov 2024	End of 2024 lead-ion run, marking the end of a record-breaking year of LHC data collection.
5 May 2025	LHC reaches its first stable beams of 2025.
4 Nov 2025	End of 2025 proton operations at CERN, exceeding the 2025 target by 5.4 fb^{−1} and surpassing the 2024 record by 1.5 fb^{−1}.
8 Dec 2025	End of 2025 lead-ion run.
Mar 2026	Start of 2026 proton operations at CERN.
Jun 2026	End of 2026 proton operations at CERN.
Jul 2026	End of 2026 lead-ion run. This marks the end of Run 3 and the start of Long Shutdown 3.
Long Shutdown 3
Jun 2030	Start of LHC beam Commissioning, beginning of Run 4.
Dec 2030	End of 2030 proton operations.
Apr 2031	Start of 2031 proton operations.
Nov 2031	End of 2031 proton operations.
Dec 2031	End of 2031 lead-ion run.
Apr 2032	Start of 2032 proton operations.
Nov 2032	End of 2032 proton operations.
Dec 2032	End of 2032 lead-ion run.
Apr 2033	Start of 2033 proton operations.
Nov 2033	End of 2033 proton operations.
Dec 2033	End of 2033 lead-ion run. Marks the end of Run 4 and the start of Long Shutdown 4.
Long Shutdown 4
May 2036	Start of LHC beam Commissioning, beginning of Run 5.
Nov 2036	End of 2036 proton operations.
Dec 2036	End of 2036 lead-ion run.
Apr 2037	Start of 2037 proton operations.
Nov 2037	End of 2037 proton operations.
Dec 2037	End of 2037 lead-ion run.
Apr 2038	Start of 2038 proton operations.
Nov 2038	End of 2038 proton operations.
Dec 2038	End of 2038 lead-ion run.
Apr 2039	Start of 2039 proton operations.
Nov 2039	End of 2039 proton operations.
Dec 2039	End of 2039 lead-ion run.
Apr 2040	Start of 2040 proton operations.
Nov 2040	End of 2040 proton operations.
Dec 2040	End of 2040 lead-ion run.
Mar 2041	Start of 2041 proton operations.
Nov 2041	End of 2041 proton operations.
Dec 2041	End of 2041 lead-ion run. End of tentative LHC schedule.

== Findings and discoveries ==
All new hadrons observed at the LHC since 2012. Hollow markers indicate superseded or non-significant hadrons.

An initial focus of research was to investigate the possible existence of the Higgs boson, a key part of the Standard Model of physics which was predicted by theory, but had not yet been observed before due to its high mass and elusive nature. CERN scientists estimated that, if the Standard Model was correct, the LHC would produce several Higgs bosons every minute, allowing physicists to finally confirm or disprove the Higgs boson's existence. In addition, the LHC allowed the search for supersymmetric particles and other hypothetical particles as possible unknown areas of physics. Some extensions of the Standard Model predict additional particles, such as the heavy W' and Z' gauge bosons, which are also estimated to be within reach of the LHC to discover.

=== First run (data taken 2009–2013) ===
The first physics results from the LHC, involving 284 collisions which took place in the ALICE detector, were reported on 15 December 2009. The results of the first proton–proton collisions at energies higher than Fermilab's Tevatron proton–antiproton collisions were published by the CMS collaboration in early February 2010, yielding greater-than-predicted charged-hadron production.

After the first year of data collection, the LHC experimental collaborations started to release their preliminary results concerning searches for new physics beyond the Standard Model in proton–proton collisions. No evidence of new particles was detected in the 2010 data. As a result, bounds were set on the allowed parameter space of various extensions of the Standard Model, such as models with large extra dimensions, constrained versions of the Minimal Supersymmetric Standard Model, and others.

On 24 May 2011, it was reported that quark–gluon plasma (the densest matter thought to exist besides black holes) had been created in the LHC.

A Feynman diagram of one way the Higgs boson may be produced at the LHC. Here, two quarks each emit a W or Z boson, which combine to make a neutral Higgs.

Between July and August 2011, results of searches for the Higgs boson and for exotic particles, based on the data collected during the first half of the 2011 run, were presented in conferences in Grenoble and Mumbai. In the latter conference, it was reported that, despite hints of a Higgs signal in earlier data, ATLAS and CMS exclude with 95% confidence level (using the CLs method) the existence of a Higgs boson with the properties predicted by the Standard Model over most of the mass region between 145 and 466 GeV. The searches for new particles did not yield signals either, allowing to further constrain the parameter space of various extensions of the Standard Model, including its supersymmetric extensions.

On 13 December 2011, CERN reported that the Standard Model Higgs boson, if it exists, is most likely to have a mass constrained to the range 115–130 GeV. Both the CMS and ATLAS detectors have also shown intensity peaks in the 124–125 GeV range, consistent with either background noise or the observation of the Higgs boson.

On 22 December 2011, it was reported that a new composite particle had been observed, the χ_{b} (3P) bottomonium state.

On 4 July 2012, both the CMS and ATLAS teams announced the discovery of a boson in the mass region around 125–126 GeV, with a statistical significance at the level of 5 sigma each. This meets the formal level required to announce a new particle. The observed properties were consistent with the Higgs boson, but scientists were cautious as to whether it is formally identified as actually being the Higgs boson, pending further analysis. On 14 March 2013, CERN announced confirmation that the observed particle was indeed the predicted Higgs boson.

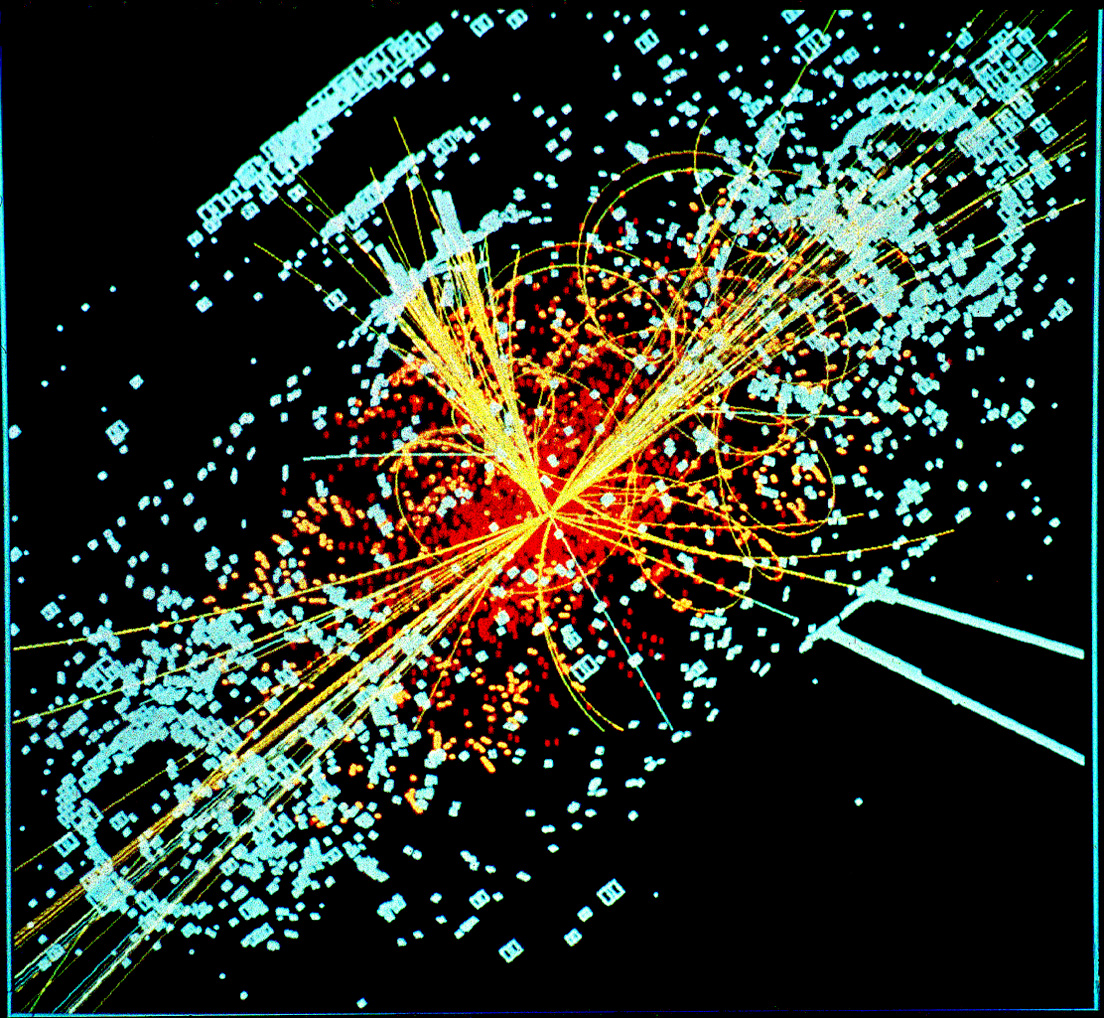
Simulated Large Hadron Collider CMS particle detector data depicting a Higgs boson produced by colliding protons decaying into hadron jets and electrons

On 8 November 2012, the LHCb team reported on an experiment seen as a "golden" test of supersymmetry theories in physics, by measuring the very rare decay of the $B_s$ meson into two muons ($B_s^0\rightarrow\mu^+\mu^-$). The results, which match those predicted by the non-supersymmetrical Standard Model rather than the predictions of many branches of supersymmetry, show the decays are less common than some forms of supersymmetry predict, though could still match the predictions of other versions of supersymmetry theory. The results as initially drafted are stated to be short of proof but at a relatively high 3.5 sigma level of significance. The result was later confirmed by the CMS collaboration.

In August 2013, the LHCb team revealed an anomaly in the angular distribution of B meson decay products which could not be predicted by the Standard Model; this anomaly had a statistical certainty of 4.5 sigma, just short of the 5 sigma needed to be officially recognized as a discovery. It is unknown what the cause of this anomaly would be, although the Z' boson has been suggested as a possible candidate.

On 19 November 2014, the LHCb experiment announced the discovery of two new heavy subatomic particles, Ξ′^{−}_{b} and Ξ^{∗−}_{b}. Both of them are baryons that are composed of one bottom, one down, and one strange quark. They are excited states of the bottom Xi baryon.

The LHCb collaboration has observed multiple exotic hadrons, possibly pentaquarks or tetraquarks, in the Run 1 data. On 4 April 2014, the collaboration confirmed the existence of the tetraquark candidate Z(4430) with a significance of over 13.9 sigma. On 13 July 2015, results consistent with pentaquark states in the decay of bottom Lambda baryons (Λ^{0}_{b}) were reported.

On 28 June 2016, the collaboration announced four tetraquark-like particles decaying into a J/ψ and a φ meson, only one of which was well established before (X(4274), X(4500) and X(4700) and X(4140)).

In December 2016, ATLAS presented a measurement of the W boson mass, researching the precision of analyses done at the Tevatron.

=== Second run (2015–2018) ===
At the conference EPS-HEP 2015 in July, the collaborations presented first cross-section measurements of several particles at the higher collision energy.

On 15 December 2015, the ATLAS and CMS experiments both reported a number of preliminary results for Higgs physics, supersymmetry (SUSY) searches and exotics searches using 13 TeV proton collision data. Both experiments saw a moderate excess around 750 GeV in the two-photon invariant mass spectrum, but the experiments did not confirm the existence of the hypothetical particle in an August 2016 report.

In July 2017, many analyses based on the large dataset collected in 2016 were shown. The properties of the Higgs boson were studied in more detail and the precision of many other results was improved.

By March 2021, the LHC experiments have discovered 59 new hadrons in the data collected during the first two runs.

=== Third run (2022–2026) ===
The third run of the LHC began in July of 2022, after more than three years of upgrades, and lasted until July of 2026.

On 5 July 2022, LHCb reported the discovery of a new type of pentaquark made up of a charm quark and a charm antiquark and an up, a down and a strange quark, observed in an analysis of decays of charged B mesons. The first-ever pair of tetraquarks was also reported.

On 18 September 2024, ATLAS reported the first observation of quantum entanglement between quarks, with it also being the highest-energy observation of entanglement so far.

As of February 2026, 79 new hadrons have been discovered in the data collected during the first three runs.

== Future plans ==
=== "High-luminosity" upgrade ===
After some years of running, any particle physics experiment typically begins to suffer from diminishing returns: as the key results reachable by the device begin to be completed, later years of operation discover proportionately less than earlier years. A common response is to upgrade the devices involved, typically in collision energy, luminosity, or improved detectors. In addition to a possible increase to 14 TeV collision energy, a luminosity upgrade of the LHC, called the High Luminosity Large Hadron Collider, started in June 2018 that will boost the accelerator's potential for new discoveries in physics, starting in 2030. The upgrade aims at increasing the luminosity of the machine by a factor of 10, up to 10^{35} cm^{−2}s^{−1}, providing a better chance to see rare processes and improving statistically marginal measurements.

=== Proposed Future Circular Collider ===
CERN has several preliminary designs for a Future Circular Collider (FCC)—which would be the most powerful particle accelerator ever built—with different types of collider ranging in cost from around €9 billion (US$10.2 billion) to €21 billion. It would use the LHC ring as preaccelerator, similar to how the LHC uses the smaller Super Proton Synchrotron. It is CERN's opening bid in a priority-setting process called the European Strategy for Particle Physics Update, and will affect the field's future well into the second half of the century. As of 2023, no fixed plan exists and it is unknown if the construction will be funded.

== Safety of particle collisions ==
The experiments at the Large Hadron Collider sparked fears that the particle collisions might produce doomsday phenomena, involving the production of stable microscopic black holes or the creation of hypothetical particles called strangelets. Two CERN-commissioned safety reviews examined these concerns and concluded that the experiments at the LHC present no danger and that there is no reason for concern, a conclusion endorsed by the American Physical Society.

The reports also noted that the physical conditions and collision events that exist in the LHC and similar experiments occur naturally and routinely in the universe without hazardous consequences, including ultra-high-energy cosmic rays observed to impact Earth with energies far higher than those in any human-made collider, like the Oh-My-God particle which had 320 million TeV of energy, and a collision energy tens of times more than the most energetic collisions produced in the LHC.

== Popular culture ==
The Large Hadron Collider gained a considerable amount of attention from outside the scientific community and its progress is followed by most popular science media. The LHC has also inspired works of fiction including novels, TV series, video games and films.

CERN employee Katherine McAlpine's "Large Hadron Rap" surpassed 8 million YouTube views as of 2022.

The band Les Horribles Cernettes was founded by women from CERN. The name was chosen so to have the same initials as the LHC.

National Geographic Channel's World's Toughest Fixes, season 2 (2010), episode 6 "Atom Smasher" features the replacement of the last superconducting magnet section in the repair of the collider after the 2008 quench incident. The episode includes actual footage from the repair facility to the inside of the collider, and explanations of the function, engineering, and purpose of the LHC.

The song "Munich" on the 2012 studio album Scars & Stories by The Fray is inspired by the Large Hadron Collider. Lead singer Isaac Slade said in an interview, "There's this large particle collider out in Switzerland that is kind of helping scientists peel back the curtain on what creates gravity and mass. Some very big questions are being raised, even some things that Einstein proposed, that have just been accepted for decades are starting to be challenged. They're looking for the God Particle, basically, the particle that holds it all together. That song is really just about the mystery of why we're all here and what's holding it all together, you know?"

The Large Hadron Collider was the focus of the 2012 student film Decay, with the movie being filmed on location in CERN's maintenance tunnels.

=== Fiction ===
The novel Angels & Demons, by Dan Brown, involves antimatter created at the LHC to be used in a weapon against the Vatican. In response, CERN published a "Fact or Fiction?" page discussing the accuracy of the book's portrayal of the LHC, CERN, and particle physics in general. The movie version of the book has footage filmed on-site at one of the experiments at the LHC; the director, Ron Howard, met with CERN experts in an effort to make the science in the story more accurate.

The novel Flashforward, by Robert J. Sawyer, involves the search for the Higgs boson at the LHC. CERN published a "Science and Fiction" page interviewing Sawyer and physicists about the book and the TV series based on it.

In the television series The Flash, the LHC serves as inspiration for the fictional particle accelerator at S.T.A.R. Labs nicknamed The Pipeline. In the show's timeline, this particle accelerator undergoes an explosion that grants Barry Allen (the Flash) his superpowers.

In the visual novel/anime series Steins;Gate, CERN is depicted as the secret organization SERN, who are researching time travel in order to control the world. In this fictional world, SERN uses the LHC to create Kerr Black Holes, allowing them to send matter through time.

== See also ==
- List of accelerators in particle physics
- Accelerator projects
  - Circular Electron Positron Collider
  - Compact Linear Collider
  - Future Circular Collider
  - International Linear Collider
  - Very Large Hadron Collider
