= International Linear Collider =

Proposed linear accelerator for subatomic particles

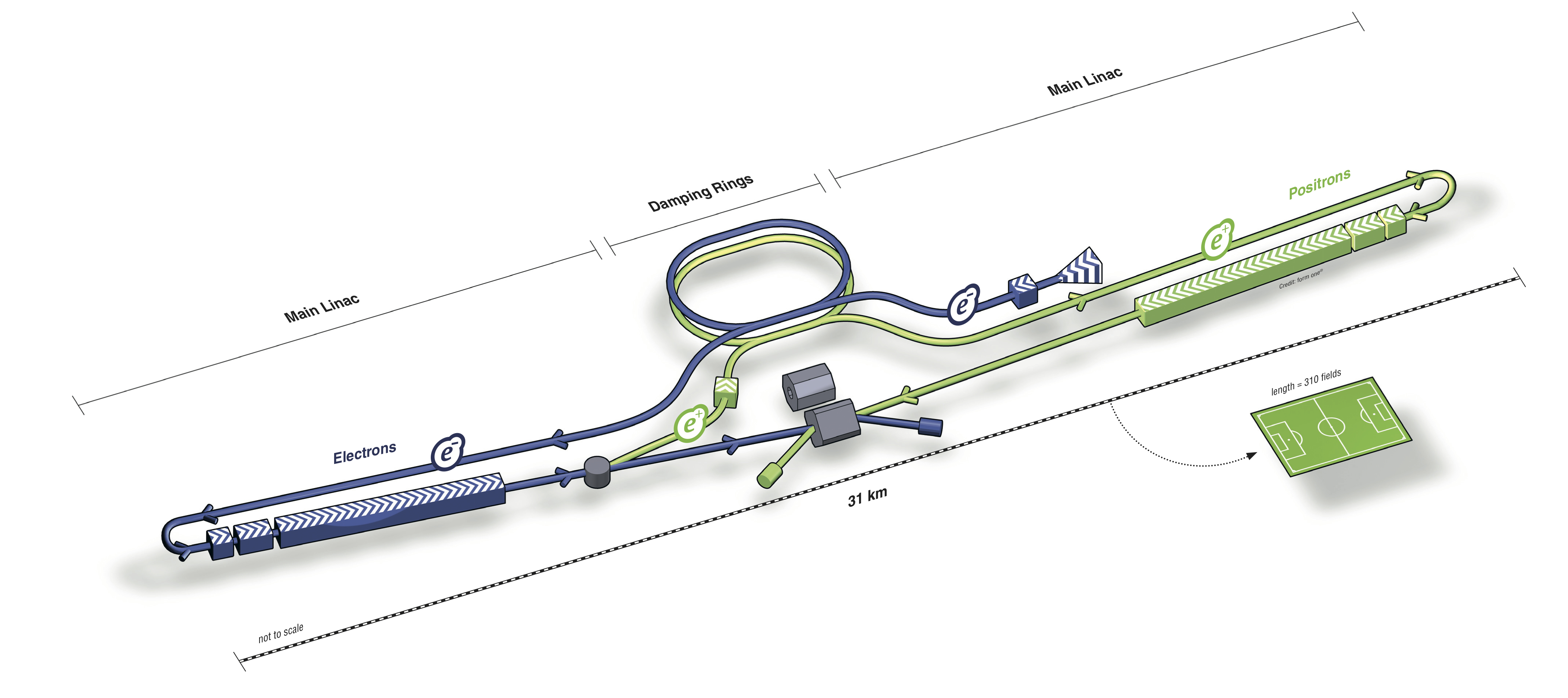
An overview graphic of the planned ILC based on the accelerator design of the Technical Design Report

The International Linear Collider (ILC) is a proposed linear particle accelerator. It is planned to have a collision energy of 500 GeV initially, with the possibility for a later upgrade to 1000 GeV (1 TeV). Although early proposed locations for the ILC were Japan, Europe (CERN) and the USA (Fermilab), the Kitakami highland in the Iwate prefecture of northern Japan has been the focus of ILC design efforts since 2013. The Japanese government is willing to contribute half of the costs, according to the coordinator of study for detectors at the ILC.

The ILC would collide electrons with positrons. It will be between 30 and 50 km (19 and 31 mi) long, more than 10 times as long as the 50 GeV Stanford Linear Accelerator, the longest existing linear particle accelerator. The proposal is based on previous similar proposals from Europe, the U.S., and Japan.

In a staged approach, the ILC could initially be constructed at 250 GeV, for use as a Higgs factory. Such a design would be approximately 20 km in length.

Studies for an alternative project, the Compact Linear Collider (CLIC) are also underway, which would operate at higher energies (up to 3 TeV) in a machine of length similar to the ILC. These two projects, CLIC and the ILC, have been unified under the Linear Collider Collaboration.

== Background: linacs and synchrotrons ==
There are two basic shapes of accelerators. Linear accelerators ("linacs") accelerate elementary particles along a straight path. Circular accelerators ("synchrotrons"), such as the Tevatron, the LEP, and the Large Hadron Collider (LHC), use circular paths. Circular geometry has significant advantages at energies up to and including tens of GeV: With a circular design, particles can be effectively accelerated over longer distances. Also, only a fraction of the particles brought onto a collision course actually collide. In a linear accelerator, the remaining particles are lost; in a ring accelerator, they keep circulating and are available for future collisions. The disadvantage of circular accelerators is that charged particles moving along bent paths will necessarily emit electromagnetic radiation known as synchrotron radiation. Energy loss through synchrotron radiation is inversely proportional to the fourth power of the mass of the particles in question. That is why it makes sense to build circular accelerators for heavy particles—hadron colliders such as the LHC for protons or, alternatively, for lead nuclei. An electron–positron collider of the same size would never be able to achieve the same collision energies. In fact, energies at the LEP which used to occupy the tunnel now given over to the LHC, were limited to 209 GeV by energy loss via synchrotron radiation.

Even though the nominal collision energy at the LHC will be higher than the ILC collision energy (14,000 GeV for the LHC vs. ~500 GeV for the ILC), measurements could be made more accurately at the ILC. Collisions between electrons and positrons are much simpler to analyze than collisions in which the energy is distributed among the constituent quarks, antiquarks and gluons of baryonic particles. As such, one of the roles of the ILC would be making precision measurements of the properties of particles discovered at the LHC.

== ILC physics and detectors ==
It is widely expected that effects of physics beyond that described in the current Standard Model will be detected by experiments at the proposed ILC. In addition, particles and interactions described by the Standard Model are expected to be discovered and measured. At the ILC physicists hope to be able to:

- Measure the mass, spin, and interaction strengths of the Higgs boson
- If existing, measure the number, size, and shape of any TeV-scale extra dimensions
- Investigate the lightest supersymmetric particles, possible candidates for dark matter

To achieve these goals, new generation particle detectors are necessary.

== Merging of regional proposals into a worldwide project ==
In August 2004, the International Technology Recommendation Panel (ITRP) recommended a superconducting radio frequency technology for the accelerator. After this decision the three existing linear collider projects – the Next Linear Collider (NLC), the Global Linear Collider (GLC) and Teraelectronvolt Energy Superconducting Linear Accelerator (TESLA) – joined their efforts into one single project (the ILC). In March 2005, the International Committee for Future Accelerators (ICFA), a working group of the International Union of Pure and Applied Physics, announced Prof. Barry Barish, director of the LIGO Laboratory at Caltech from 1997 to 2005, as the Director of the Global Design Effort (GDE). In August 2007, the Reference Design Report for the ILC was released. Physicists working on the GDE completed a detailed ILC design report, publishing it in June 2013.

== Design ==
The electron source for the ILC will use 2-nanosecond laser light pulses to eject electrons from a photocathode, a technique allowing for up to 80% of the electrons to be polarized; the electrons then will be accelerated to 5 GeV in a 370-meter linac stage. Synchrotron radiation from high energy electrons will produce electron-positron pairs on a titanium-alloy target, with as much as 60% polarization; the positrons from these collisions will be collected and accelerated to 5 GeV in a separate linac.

To compact the 5 GeV electron and positron bunches to a sufficiently small size to be usefully collided, they will circulate for 0.1–0.2 seconds in a pair of damping rings, 3.24 km in circumference, in which they will be reduced in size to 6 mm in length and a vertical and horizontal emittance of 2 pm and 0.6 nm, respectively.

From the damping rings the particle bunches will be sent to the superconducting radio frequency main linacs, each 11 km long, where they will be accelerated to 250 GeV. At this energy each beam will have an average power of about 5.3 megawatts. Five bunch trains will be produced and accelerated per second.

To maintain a sufficient luminosity to produce results in a reasonable time frame after acceleration the bunches will be focused to a few nanometers in height and a few hundred nanometers in width. The focused bunches then will be collided inside one of two large particle detectors.

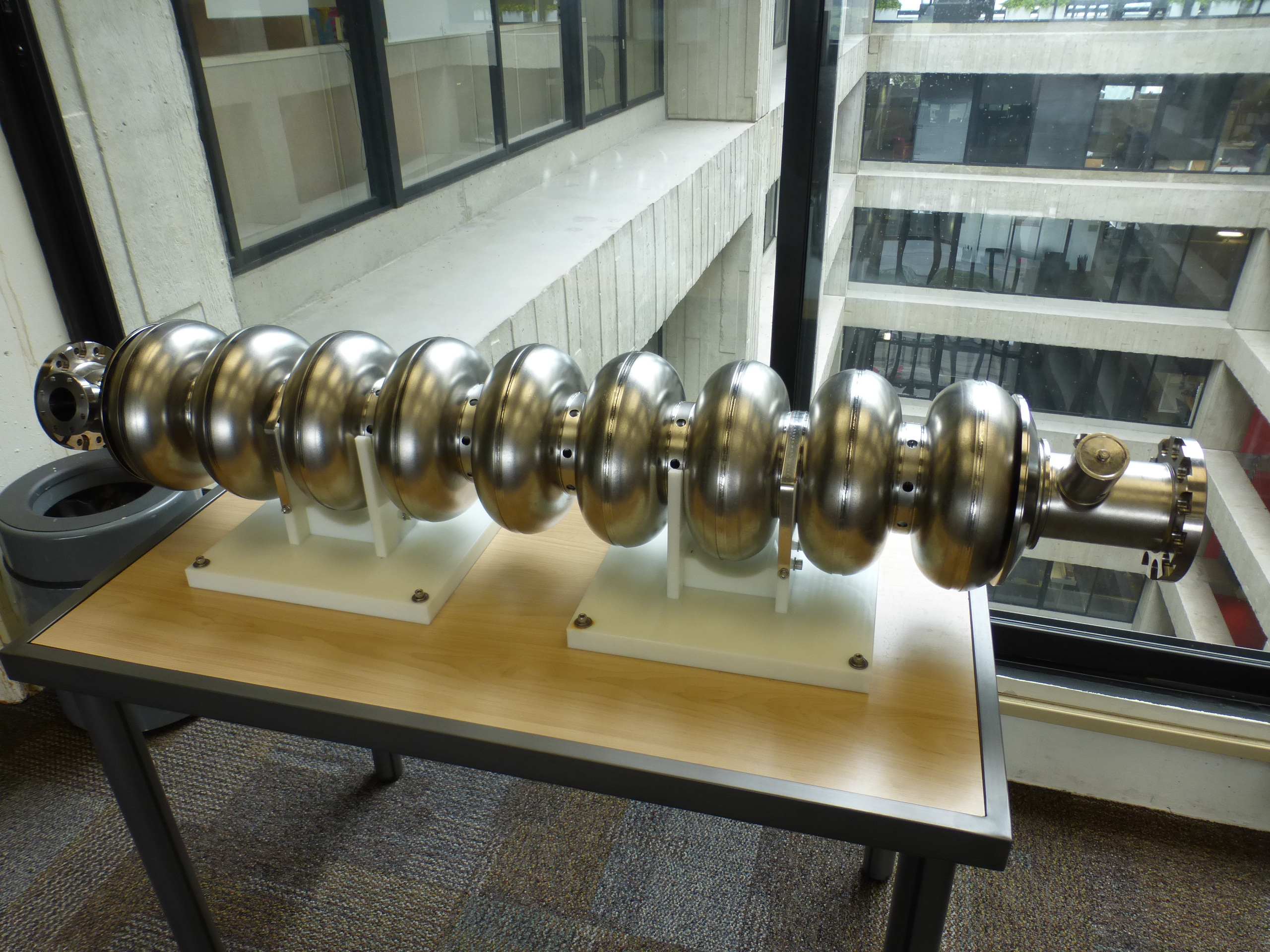
A niobium-based 1.3 GHz nine-cell superconducting radio frequency cavity to be used at the main linac

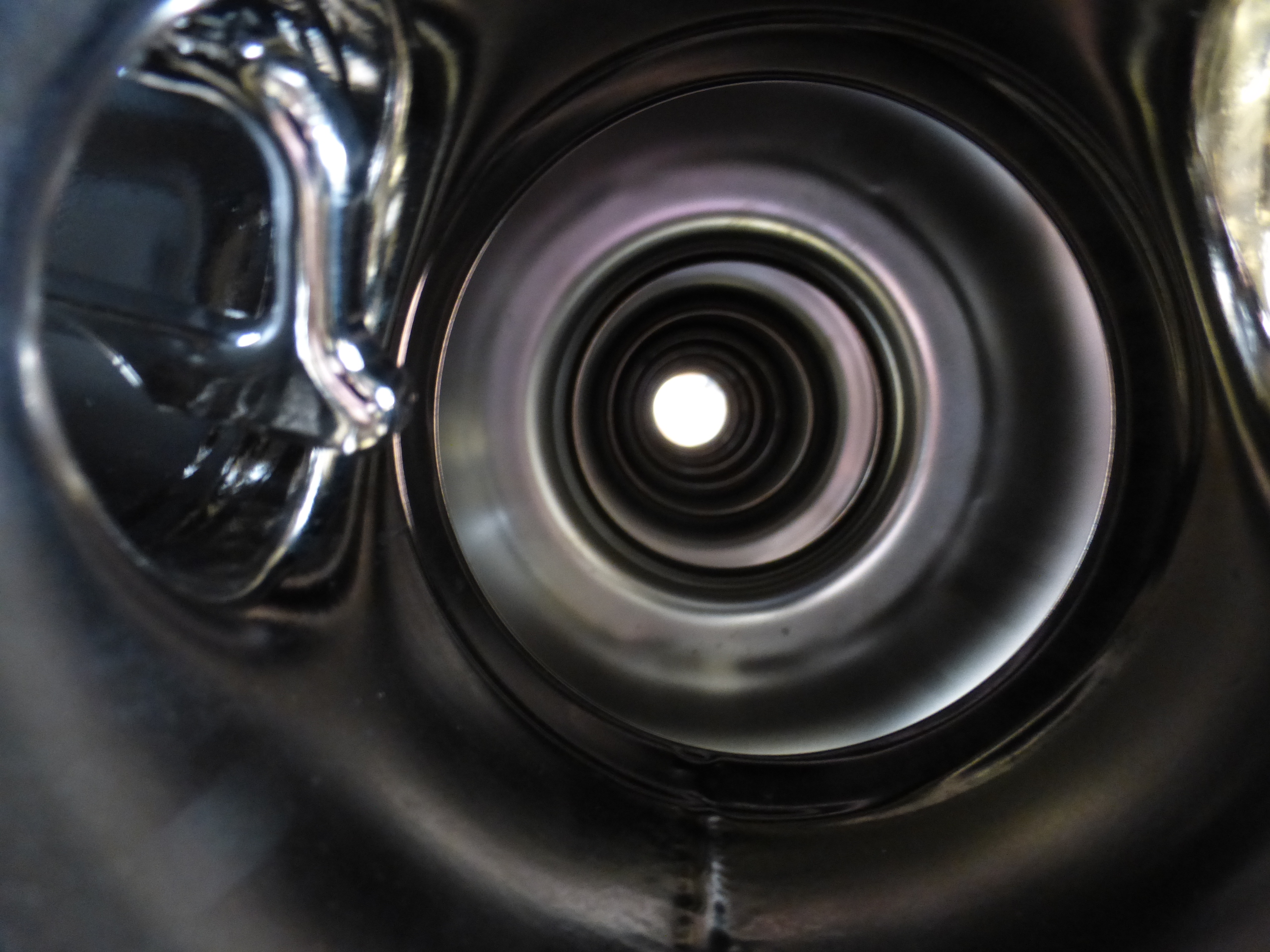
An interior view of the niobium superconducting radio frequency cavity

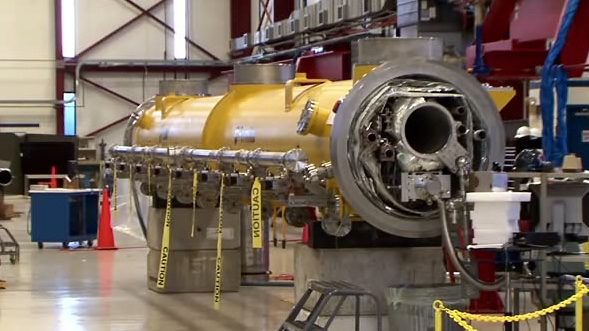
A cryomodule being tested at Fermilab

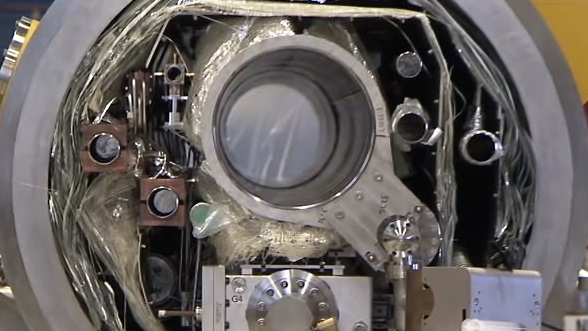
Cross section of the cryomodule. A large tube at the center is helium gas return pipe. The closed tube below it is the beam axis.

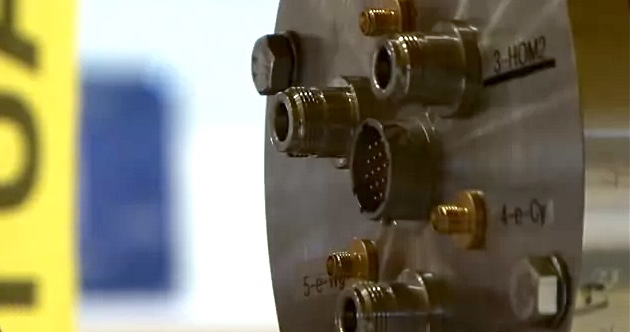
A flange of the cryomodule is used to connect instrumentation wires and cables.

== Proposed sites ==
Originally, three sites for the International Linear Collider were leading contenders at established High Energy Physics centers in Europe. At CERN in Geneva the tunnel is located deep underground in non-permeable bedrock. This site was considered favorable for a number of practical reasons but due to the LHC the site was disfavored. At DESY in Hamburg the tunnel is close to the surface in water saturated soil. Germany leads Europe for scientific funding and was therefore considered reliable in terms of funding. At JINR in Dubna the tunnel is close to the surface in non-permeable soil. Dubna has a pre-accelerator complex which could have been easily adapted for the needs for the ILC. But all three were more or less well suited for housing a Linear Collider and one had ample choice for a site selection process in Europe.

Outside Europe a number of countries expressed interest. Japan receives a large amount of funding for neutrino activities, such as the T2K experiment, a factor not in its favor, although 20 huge caverns with access tunnels have already been constructed in Japan for hydroelectric power plants (e.g. the Kannagawa Hydropower Plant). Following the closure of the Tevatron some groups within the USA had expressed interest, with Fermilab being a favored site because of the facilities and experts already present. Much of the speculated interest from other countries was hearsay from within the scientific community, and very few facts were published officially. The information presented above is a summary of that contained in the International Workshop on Linear Colliders 2010 (ECFA-CLIC-ILC Joint Meeting) at CERN.

The 2008 economic crisis led the United States and United Kingdom to cut funds to the collider project, leading to Japan's position as the most likely host for the International Linear Collider. On August 23, 2013, the Japanese high-energy physics community's site evaluation committee proposed it should be located in the Kitakami Mountains of the Iwate and Miyagi Prefectures. As of March 7, 2019, the Japanese government has stated that it is not ready to support the construction of the Collider due to its high proposed cost of approximately $7 billion. This decision was informed partly by the Science Council of Japan. The Japanese government sought monetary support from other countries to help fund this project.

In 2022, the Japanese plan for the ILC was "shelved" by a panel for Japan's Ministry of Education, Culture, Sports, Science and Technology (MEXT) Several reasons were given, including potentially insufficient international support and the CERN proposal for the Future Circular Collider, which has overlapping physics goals with the ILC.

In March 2024, the "Federation of Diet Members for the ILC" met to receive "Reports on the ILC project's progress and initiatives by relevant organizations". Fifty participants, including Diet members and other government agencies, as well as researchers and businesses, received reports on the project's progress. Participants discussed the ILC's future. The meeting resulted in three recommendations:

1. The ILC project will be further promoted by the research community, industry, organizations promoting the candidate sites, relevant ministries and agencies, the Diet members and other political organizations within an all-Japan framework.

2. For the ILC project, international collaboration will be further strengthened as a global initiative involving the research community. This will be achieved through close cooperation between the ILC International Development Team (IDT), an international promotion organization established under ICFA, and the domestic research community.

3. The Ministry of Education, Culture, Sports, Science and Technology (MEXT) should play an active role in collaborating with the international research community to achieve the global accelerator program. This collaboration should utilize the framework of the Liaison Committee on Future High-Performance Accelerators, in partnership with the Cabinet Office, as well as other relevant ministries and agencies.

— Federation of Diet Members for ILC, Recommendation for the Promotion of the International Linear Collider Project

In December 2024, the ILC cleared a key hurdle in Japan when it received approval from the Science Council of Japan (SCJ), ending a years-long hold and allowing Japan's Ministry of Education, Culture, Sports, Science and Technology (MEXT) to advance with formulating a national science roadmap. “The SCJ process is over and MEXT can move forward,” noted Hitoshi Murayama, deputy director of the Linear Collider Collaboration, in early discussions around this milestone.

This progress has been accompanied by intensified lobbying from the Japanese high-energy physics community (via ILC-Japan and KEK) toward MEXT, emphasizing the need for stronger commitments on international funding before finalizing any decision, with expectations of at least 50% contributions from abroad (including formal discussions initiated with France, Germany, the U.K., and the U.S.). The proposed site remains the Kitakami highlands in Iwate and Miyagi prefectures, representing a potential revitalization effort for the Tohoku region, though ground surveys have also been conducted in areas like Karatsu, Saga Prefecture. Globally, the ILC's prospects continue to evolve through initiatives like the Linear Collider Vision (LC Vision), with ongoing engineering studies advocating for a Pre-lab phase to coordinate international efforts.

== Cost ==
The Reference Design Report estimated the cost of building the ILC, excluding R&D, prototyping, land acquisition, underground easement costs, detectors, contingencies, and inflation, at US$6.75 billion (in 2007 prices). From formal project approval, completion of the accelerator complex and detectors is expected to require seven years. The host country would be required to pay $1.8 billion for site-specific costs like digging tunnels and shafts and supplying water and electricity.

Former U.S. Secretary of Energy Steven Chu estimated the total cost to be US$25 billion. ILC Director Barish said this is likely to be an overestimate. Other Department of Energy officials have estimated a $20 billion total. Upon completion of the 2013 ILC Design Report, Barish said the cost of building the ILC was the equivalent of 7.78 billion 2012 U.S. dollars; it will require "22.6 million hours of labor and location-specific costs including site preparation, scientific detectors and facility operations."
