= GDE =

GDE or gde may refer to:

== Science and technology ==
- Global Design Effort, a team tasked with designing the International Linear Collider
- Global digital exemplar, an NHS project to facilitate the transfer of knowledge from digitally advanced trusts to those less advanced
- Glycogen debranching enzyme, a molecule that helps facilitate the breakdown of glycogen
- Gnome desktop environment, GNOME a desktop environment for Linux and most BSD derivatives
- Gas diffusion electrode, electrodes with a conjunction of a solid, liquid and gaseous interface
- Google Developer Expert, a certification by Google

== Other uses ==
- Gauteng Department of Education, South Africa
- Gode Airport (IATA code GDE), Ethiopia
- Guangdong Enterprises, a former name for Guangdong Holdings
- Gungahlin Drive Extension, a road project in Canberra, Australia
- Gude language (ISO 639-3 code)
