= Barry Barish =

American physicist and Nobel Laureate (born 1936)

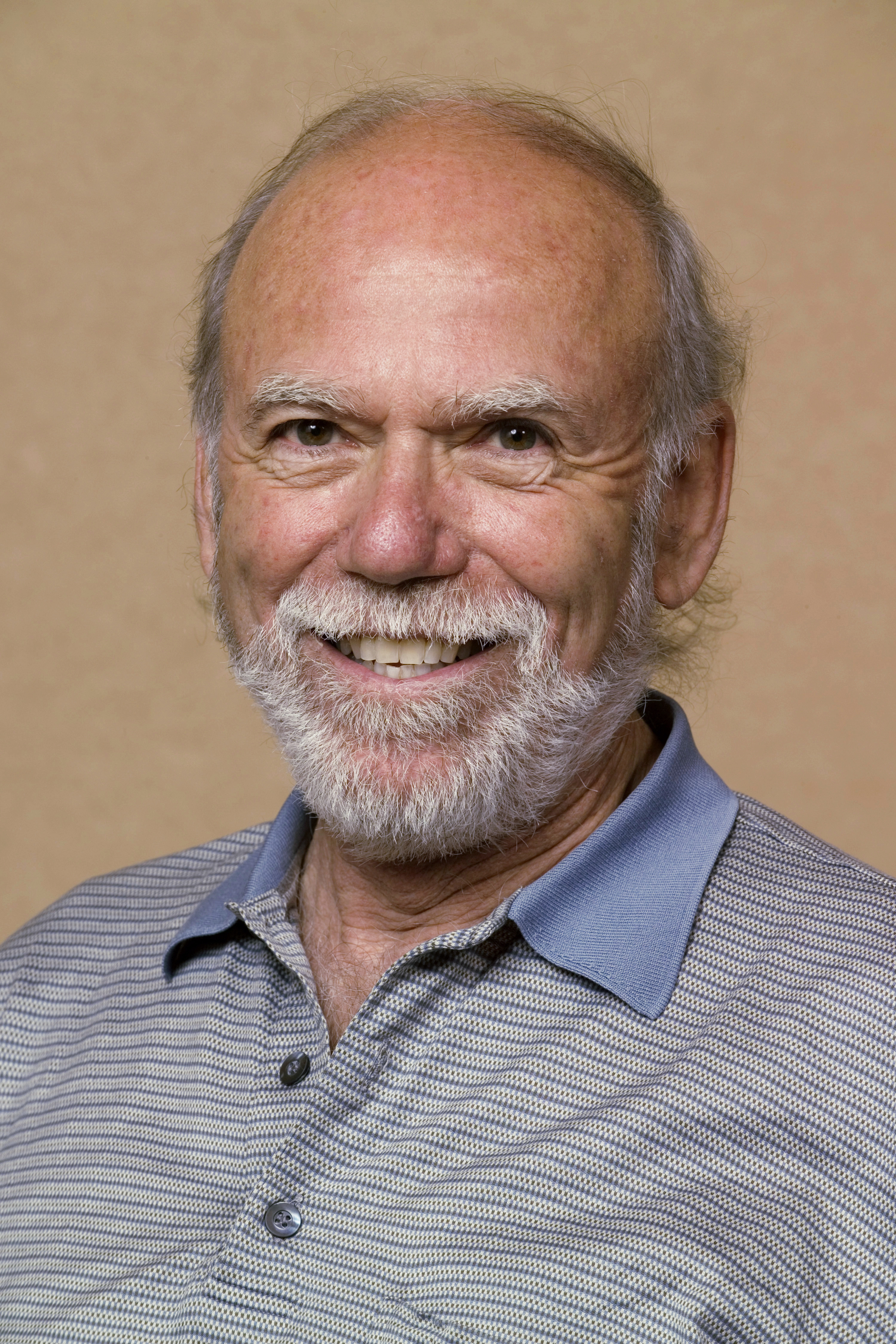
- Barish in 2005
- Born: Barry Clark Barish; January 27, 1936 (age 90); Omaha, Nebraska, U.S.
- Education: University of California, Berkeley (BA, PhD)
- Spouse: Samoan Barish
- Children: 2
- Awards: Klopsteg Memorial Award (2002); Member of the National Academy of Sciences (2002); Enrico Fermi Prize (2016); Henry Draper Medal (2017); Princess of Asturias Award (2017); Nobel Prize in Physics (2017); Copernicus Prize (2023); National Medal of Science (2023)
- Scientific career
- Fields: Physics
- Workplaces: University of California, Riverside; Stony Brook University; California Institute of Technology; Sapienza University of Rome
- Thesis: A study of the reaction negative pion plus proton going to negative pion plus neutral pion plus proton at 310 and 377 MEV (1962)
- Doctoral advisor: A. Carl Helmholz
- Doctoral students: Kate Scholberg

Barry Clark Barish (born January 27, 1936) is an American experimental physicist and Nobel Laureate. He is a Linde Professor of Physics, emeritus at California Institute of Technology and a leading expert on gravitational waves.

In 2017, Barish was awarded the Nobel Prize in Physics along with Rainer Weiss and Kip Thorne "for decisive contributions to the LIGO detector and the observation of gravitational waves". He said, "I didn't know if I would succeed. I was afraid I would fail, but because I tried, I had a breakthrough."

In 2018, he joined the faculty at University of California, Riverside, becoming the university's second Nobel Prize winner on the faculty.

In the fall of 2023, he joined Stony Brook University as the inaugural President's Distinguished Endowed Chair in Physics.

In 2023, Barish was awarded the National Medal of Science by President Biden in a White House ceremony.

== Birth and education ==
Barish was born in Omaha, Nebraska, the son of Lee and Harold Barish. His parents' families were Jewish immigrants from a part of Poland that is now in Belarus. Just after World War II, the family moved to Los Feliz in Los Angeles. He attended John Marshall High School and other schools.

He earned a B.A. degree in physics (1957) and a Ph.D. degree in experimental high energy physics (1962) at the University of California, Berkeley. He joined Caltech in 1963 as part of a new experimental effort in particle physics using frontier particle accelerators at the national laboratories. From 1963 to 1966, he was a research fellow, and from 1966 to 1991 an assistant professor, associate professor, and professor of physics. From 1991 to 2005, he became Linde Professor of Physics, and after that Linde Professor of Physics, emeritus. From 1984 to 1996, he was the principal investigator of Caltech High Energy Physics Group.

== Research ==
Firstly, Barish's experiments were performed at Fermilab using high-energy neutrino collisions to reveal the quark substructure of the nucleon. Among others, these experiments were the first to observe a current that was weak and neutral, a linchpin of the electroweak unification theories of Salam, Glashow, and Weinberg.

In the 1980s, he directed MACRO, an experiment in a cave in Gran Sasso, Italy, that searched for exotic particles called magnetic monopoles and also studied penetrating cosmic rays, including neutrino measurements that provided important confirmatory evidence that neutrinos have mass and oscillate.

In 1991, Barish was named the Maxine and Ronald Linde Professor of Physics at Caltech.

In the early 1990s, he spearheaded GEM (Gammas, Electrons, Muons), an experiment that would have run at the Superconducting Super Collider which was approved after the former project L* led by Samuel Ting (and Barish as chairman of collaboration board) was rejected by SSC director Roy Schwitters. Barish was GEM spokesperson.

Barish became the principal investigator of the Laser Interferometer Gravitational-wave Observatory (LIGO) in 1994 and director in 1997. He led the effort through the approval of funding by the NSF National Science Board in 1994, the construction and commissioning of the LIGO interferometers in Livingston, LA and Hanford, WA in 1997. He created the LIGO Scientific Collaboration, which now numbers more than 1000 collaborators worldwide to carry out the science.

The initial LIGO detectors reached design sensitivity and set many limits on astrophysical sources. The Advanced LIGO proposal was developed while Barish was director, and he has continued to play a leading role in LIGO and Advanced LIGO. The first detection of the merger of two 30 solar mass black holes was made on September 14, 2015. This represented the first direct detection of gravitational waves since they were predicted by Einstein in 1916 and the first ever observation of the merger of a pair of black holes. Barish delivered the first presentation on this discovery to a scientific audience at CERN on February 11, 2016, simultaneously with the public announcement.

From 2001 to 2002, Barish served as co-chair of the High Energy Physics Advisory Panel subpanel that developed a long-range plan for U.S. high energy physics. He has chaired the Commission of Particles and Fields and the U.S. Liaison committee to the International Union of Pure and Applied Physics (IUPAP). In 2002, he chaired the NRC Board of Physics and Astronomy Neutrino Facilities Assessment Committee Report, "Neutrinos and Beyond".

From 2005 to 2013, Barish was director of the Global Design Effort for the International Linear Collider (ILC). The ILC is a proposed particle accelerator intended to complement the Large Hadron Collider at CERN by enabling precision studies at the TeV energy scale. The project has involved international coordination among research institutions to develop a common technical design framework for a large-scale particle physics facility.

== Honors and awards ==
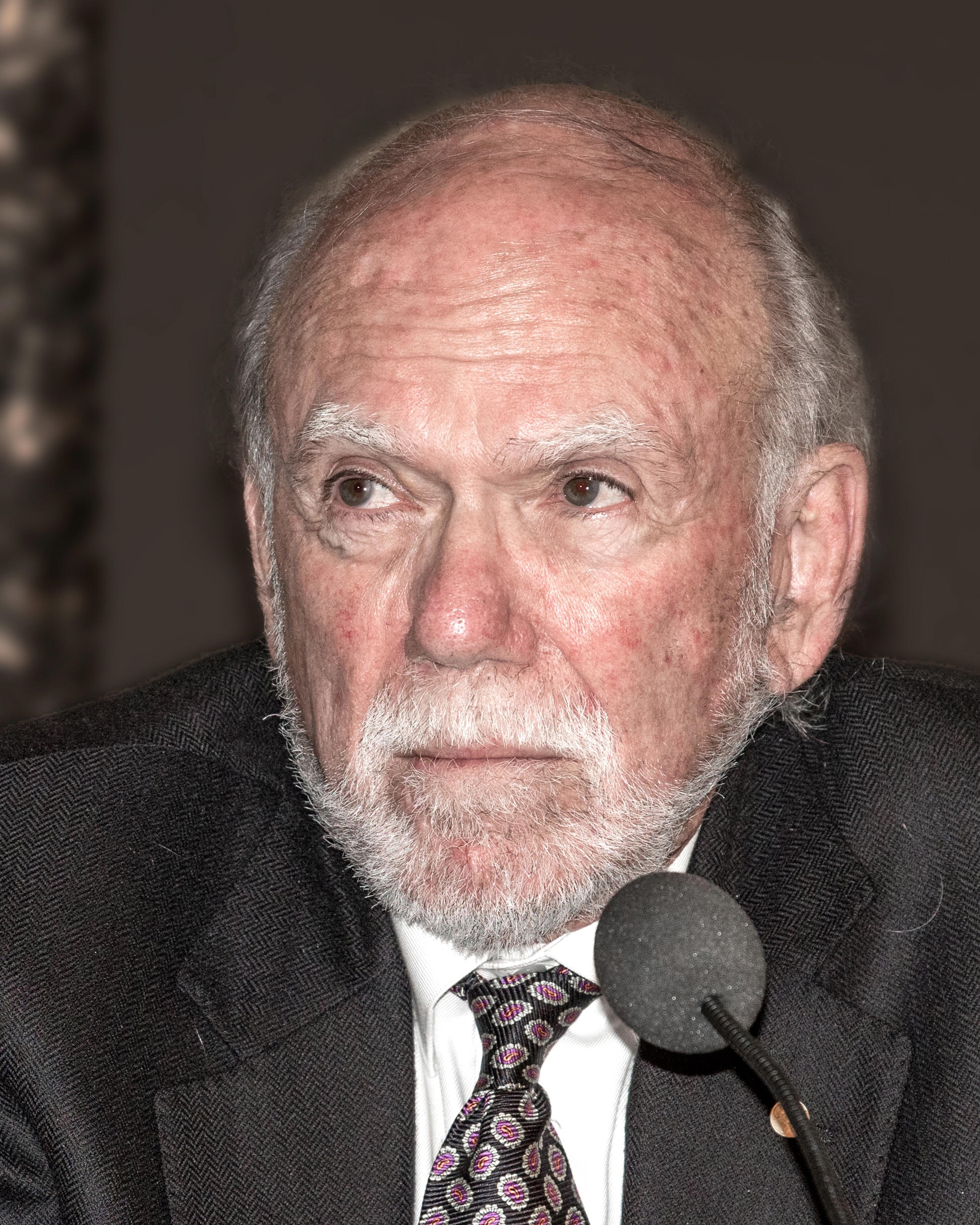
Barry C. Barish at Nobel Prize press conference in Stockholm, Sweden (December 2017)

In 2002, he received the Klopsteg Memorial Award of the American Association of Physics Teachers. Barish was honored by the University of Bologna (2006) and University of Florida ( 2007) where he received honorary doctorates. In 2007, delivered the Van Vleck lectures at the University of Minnesota. The University of Glasgow honored Barish with an honorary degree of science in 2013.

Barish was honored as a Titan of Physics in the On the Shoulders of Giants series at the 2016 World Science Festival.

In 2016, Barish received the Enrico Fermi Prize "for his fundamental contributions to the formation of the LIGO and LIGO-Virgo scientific collaborations and for his role in addressing challenging technological and scientific aspects whose solution led to the first detection of gravitational waves".

Barish was a recipient of the 2016 Smithsonian magazine's American Ingenuity Award in the Physical Science category.

Barish was awarded the 2017 Henry Draper Medal from the National Academy of Sciences "for his visionary and pivotal leadership role, scientific guidance, and novel instrument design during the development of LIGO that were crucial for LIGO's discovery of gravitational waves from colliding black holes, thus directly validating Einstein's 100-year-old prediction of gravitational waves and ushering a new field of gravitational wave astronomy."

Barish was a recipient of the 2017 Giuseppe and Vanna Cocconi Prize of the European Physical Society for his "pioneering and leading role in the LIGO observatory that led to the direct detection of gravitational waves, opening a new window to the Universe."

Barish was a recipient of the 2017 Princess of Asturias Award for his work on gravitational waves (jointly with Kip Thorne and Rainer Weiss).

Barish was a recipient of the 2017 Fudan-Zhongzhi Science Award for his leadership in the construction and initial operations of LIGO, the creation of the international LIGO Scientific Collaboration, and for the successful conversion of LIGO from small science executed by a few research groups into big science that involved large collaborations and major infrastructures, which eventually enabled gravitational-wave detection" (jointly with Kip Thorne and Rainer Weiss).

In 2017, he won the Nobel Prize in Physics (jointly with Rainer Weiss and Kip Thorne) "for decisive contributions to the LIGO detector and the observation of gravitational waves".

In 2018, Barish was honored as the Alumnus of the year by the University of California, Berkeley.

In 2018, he received an honorary doctorate at Southern Methodist University.

In 2018, he was conferred the Honorary Degree Doctor Honoris Causa of Sofia University St. Kliment Ohridski.

In 2023, he was awarded the inaugural the Copernicus Prize, bestowed by the government of Poland on "those who made exceptional contributions to the development of world science."

In 2023, he was awarded the National Medal of Science for "exemplary service to science, including groundbreaking research on sub-atomic particles. His leadership of the Laser Interferometer Gravitational-Wave Observatory led to the first detection of gravitational waves from merging black holes, confirming a key part of Einstein's Theory of Relativity. He has broadened our understanding of the universe and our Nation's sense of wonder and discovery."

In 2025, he was awarded the prestigious Homi Bhabha Medal and Prize during the inauguration of 39th International Cosmic Ray Conference, Geneva, Switzerland.

Barish has been elected to and held fellowship at the following organizations:

- the American Academy of Arts and Sciences (AAAS)
- the National Academy of Sciences (NAS)
- the National Science Board (NSB)
- Fellow of American Physical Society (APS) (President 2011)
- Fellow of American Association for the Advancement of Science (AAAS)

== Family ==
Barry Barish is married to Samoan Barish. They have two children, Stephanie Barish and Kenneth Barish, professor and chair of Physics & Astronomy at University of California, Riverside, and three grandchildren, Milo Barish Chamberlin, Thea Chamberlin, and Ariel Barish.

== See also ==
- List of Jewish Nobel laureates
