= LEP Pre-Injector =

The LEP Pre-Injector (LPI) was the initial source that provided electrons and positrons to CERN's accelerator complex for the Large Electron–Positron Collider (LEP) from 1989 until 2000.

LPI comprised the LEP Injector Linac (LIL) and the Electron Positron Accumulator (EPA).

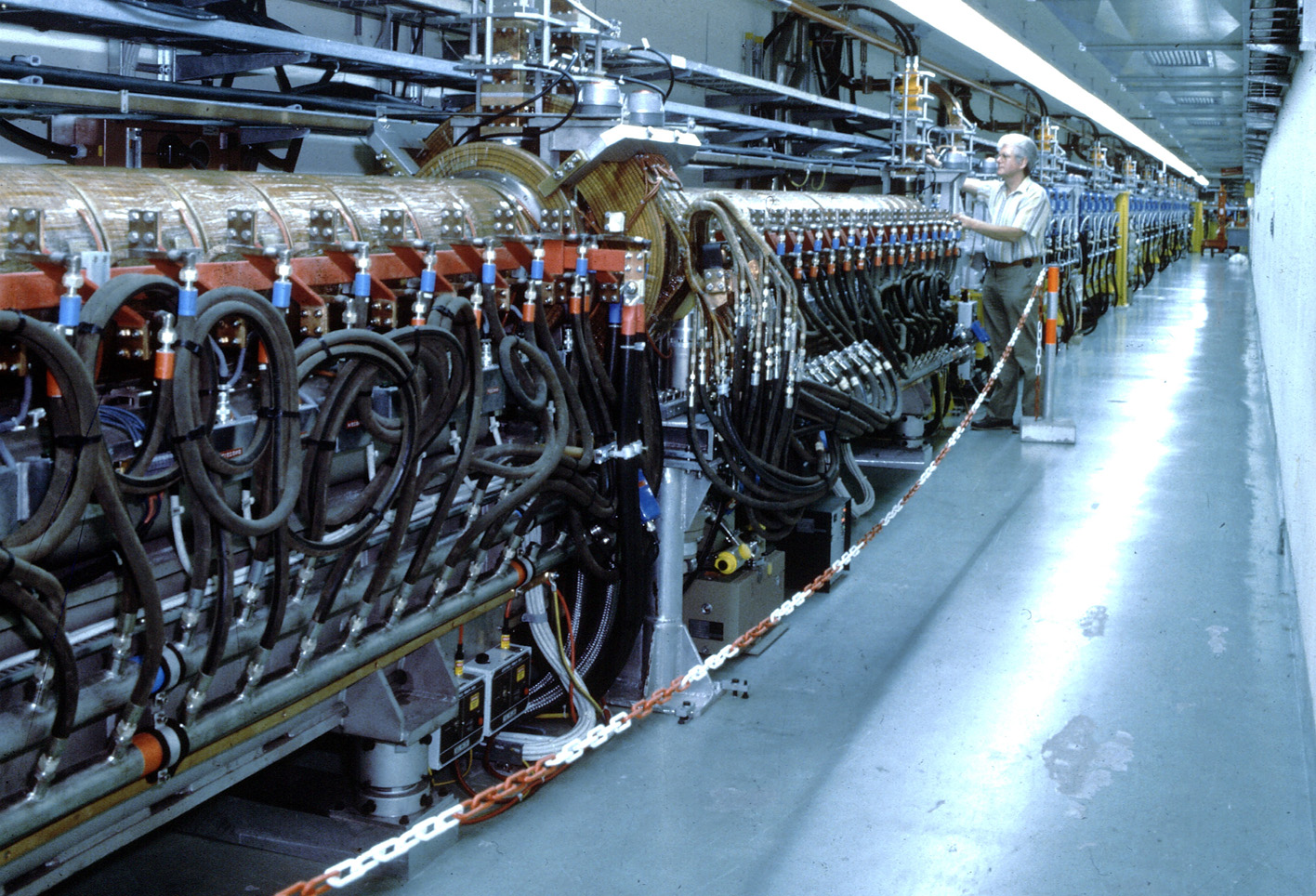
LEP Injector Linac

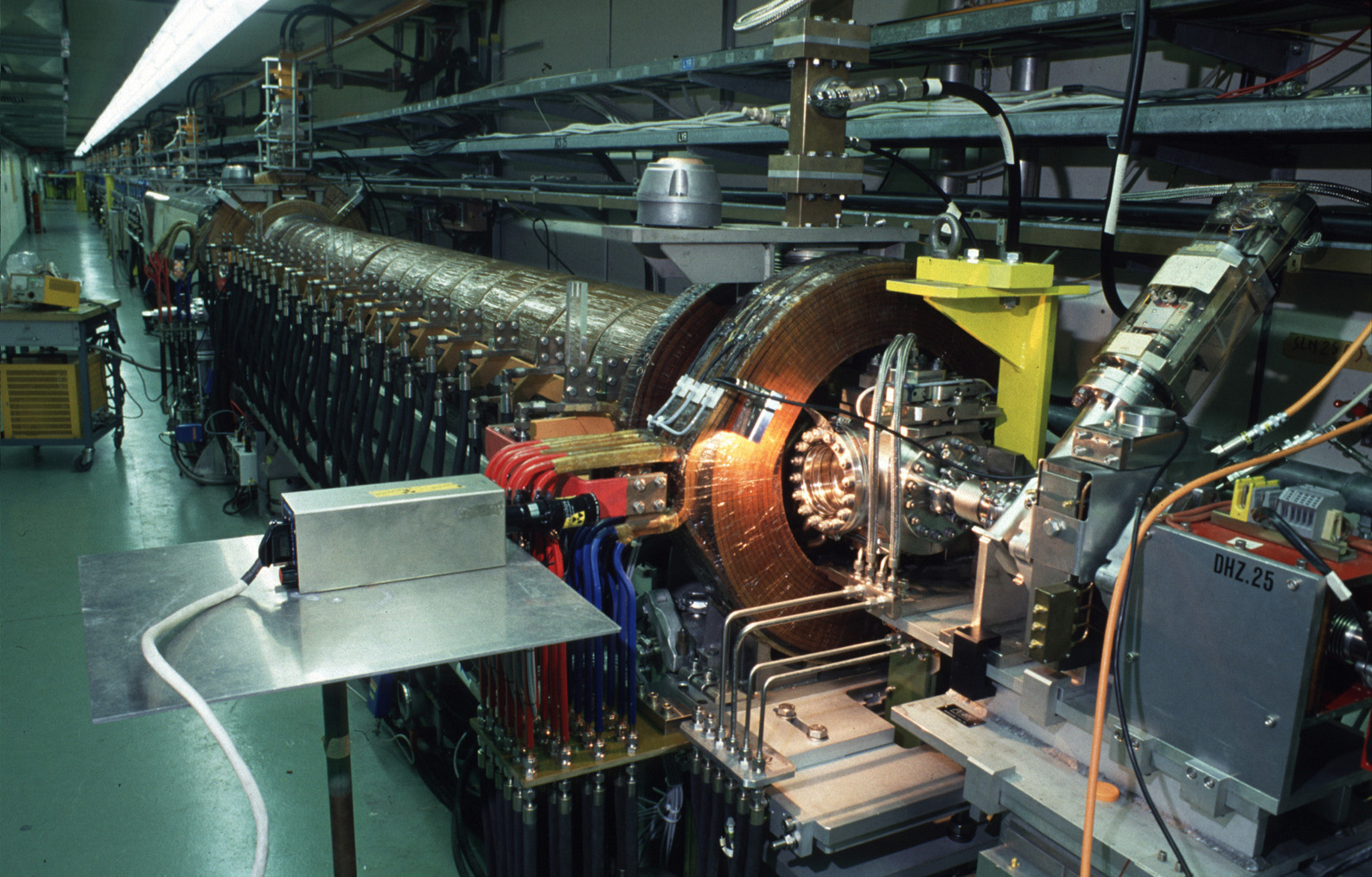
LIL-W with electron-positron converter

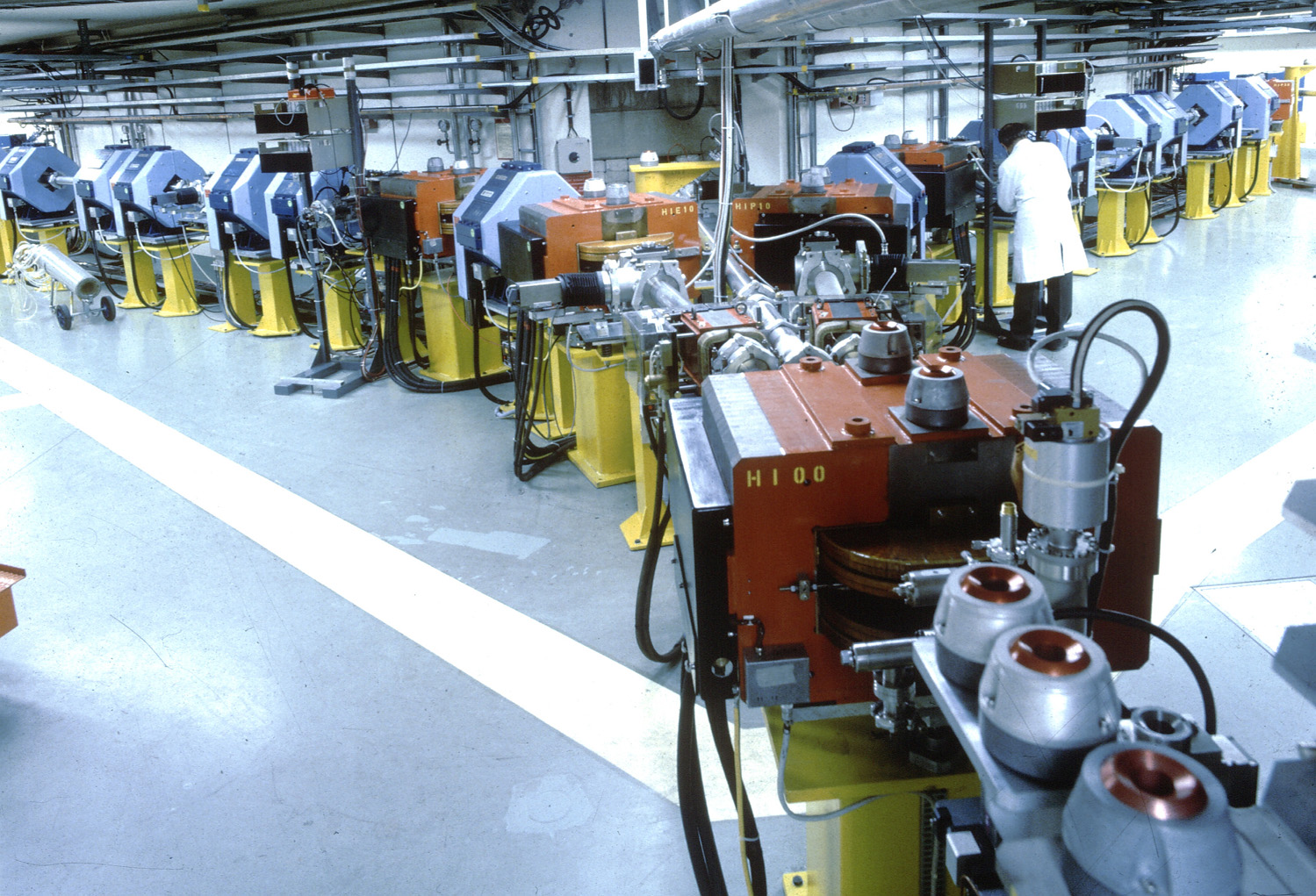
Electron Positron Accumulator

== History ==
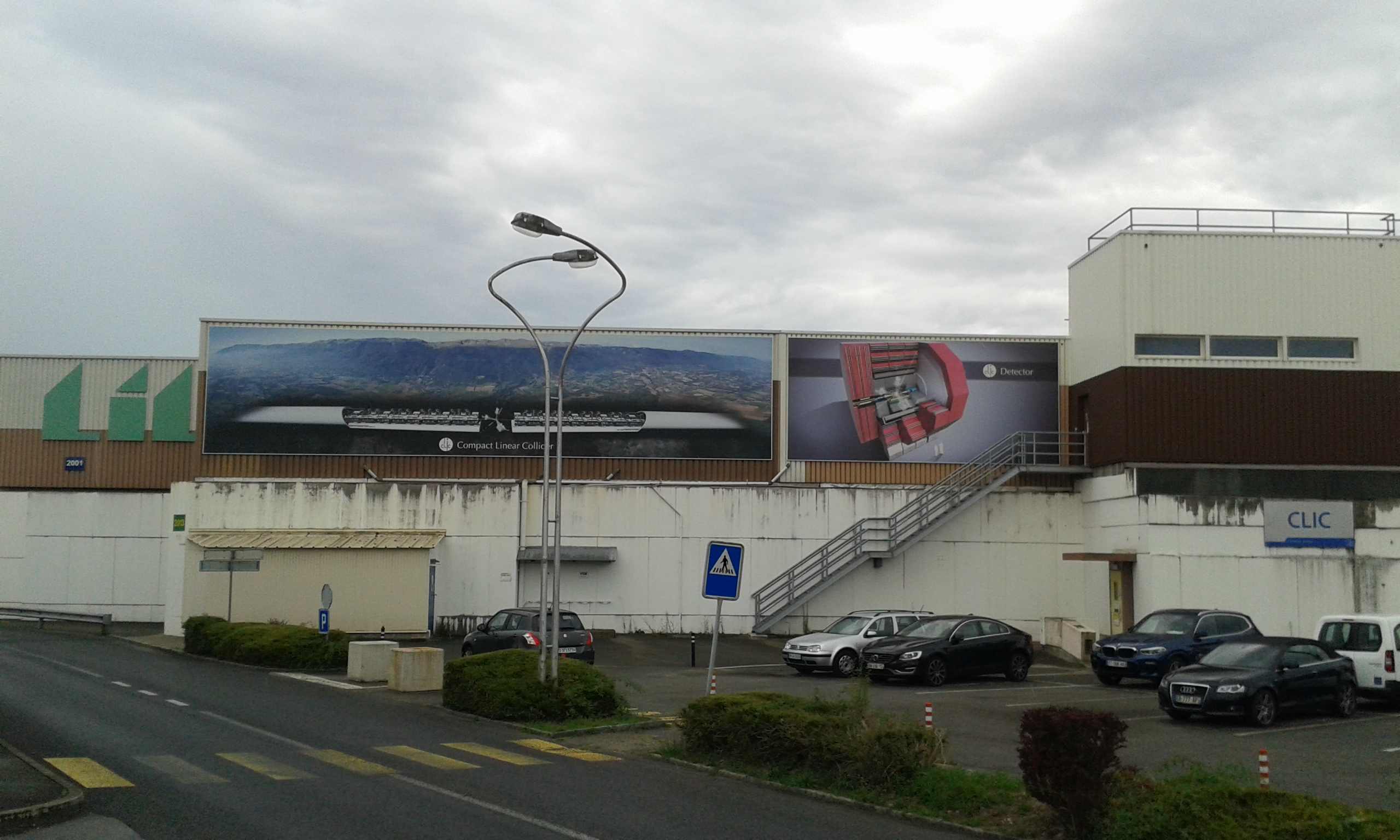
Building of the former LEP Injector Linac (LIL) at CERN, afterwards housing the CLIC test facility. The green LIL sign is still visible on the left side of building 2001.

After groundbreaking for the LEP Collider had taken place in September 1983, the design for its injection scheme, the LEP Pre-Injector (LPI), was finalized in 1984. The construction was planned and implemented in close collaboration with Laboratoire de l'accélérateur linéaire (LAL) in Orsay, France. Since there had been no electron/positron accelerators at CERN before, LAL was a valuable source of expertise and experience in this regard.

The first electron beam with an energy of 80 keV was produced on May 23, 1985. LIL injected electrons with an energy of 500 MeV into EPA from July 1986 on, and soon after EPA reached its design intensity. The same was achieved for positrons in April 1987, so the LPI-complex was fully operational in 1987. For the following two years, the accelerating system was further commissioned, threading the electron and positron beams through LIL, EPA, the Proton Synchrotron (PS), the Super Proton Synchrotron (SPS), until finally reaching LEP. The first injection into LEP's ring was achieved on July 14, 1989, one day earlier than originally scheduled. The first collisions were performed on August 13 and the first physics run, allowing LEP's experiments to take data, took place on September 20.

LPI was serving as a source of electrons and positrons for LEP from 1989 until November 7, 2000, when the last beams were delivered to LEP. Nevertheless, the source continued to operate for other experiments until April 2001 (see section below). After this, work begun to convert LPI facility to be used for the CLIC Test Facility 3 (CTF3), which conducted preliminary research and development for the future Compact Linear Collider (CLIC). The conversion happened in stages, with the first stage (so-called preliminary phase) starting accelerator commissioning in September 2001. At the end of 2016, CTF3 stopped its operation. From 2017 on, it was transformed into the CERN Linear Electron Accelerator for Research (CLEAR).

== Operation ==
LPI comprised the LEP Injector Linac (LIL), which had two parts (LIL V and LIL W), as well as the Electron Positron Accumulator (EPA).

LIL consisted of two linear accelerators in tandem, having a total length of approximately 100 meters. First, at the starting point of LIL V, electrons with an energy of 80 keV were created by a thermionic gun. LIL V then accelerated electrons at high currents to an energy of around 200 MeV. These were either accelerated further or used to create positrons, their antiparticles. At the beginning of LIL W, which followed directly behind LIL V, the electrons were shot onto a tungsten target, where the positrons were produced. In LIL W, both the electrons and positrons could then be accelerated to 500 MeV at lower currents than in LIL V. In the initial reports, LIL was designed to reach beam energies of 600 MeV. However, during the first months of operation, it became clear that an output energy of 500 MeV allowed for a more reliable running of the machine.

LIL consisted of so-called S band Linacs. These linear accelerators used a 35 MW pulsed klystron that drove microwave cavities at a frequency of 3 GHz, which accelerated the electrons and positrons.

After passing through LIL, the particles were injected into EPA, electrons rotating clockwise and positrons counterclockwise. There, both particle types were accumulated to achieve sufficient beam intensities and to match the high frequency output of LIL (100 Hz) to the frequency at which the PS operated (approximately 0.8 Hz). After passing EPA, the particles were delivered to the PS and SPS for further acceleration, before they reached their final destination, LEP. EPA had a circumference of 125.7 m, which corresponded to exactly one fifth of PS' circumference.

== Other experiments ==
LPI didn't just provide electrons and positrons to LEP, but also fed different experiments and test installations located directly at LPI's infrastructure.

The first of these was the Hippodrome Single Electron (HSE) experiment. The unusual request for single electrons was made in March 1988 by the L3 collaboration. By the end of 1988, the setup was running, allowing for a precise calibration of the L3 detector, which was to be installed at LEP soon after.

Those particles that were not deflected into EPA when coming from LIL, were directed straight into a "dump line". There, in the middle of the EPA ring, the LIL Experimental Area (LEA) was set up. The electrons coming there were used for many different applications throughout LIL's operation, testing and preparing LEP's and later LHC's detectors. Most famously, the optical fibres for one of CMS's calorimeters were tested here in 2001 during the preparation time of the LHC.

Additionally, the two Synchrotron Light Facilities SLF 92 and SLF 42 used the synchrotron radiation emitted by the electrons that were circling EPA. Until the beginning of 2001, the effects of synchrotron radiation on LHC's vacuum chambers were studied at SLF 92 with the COLDEX experiment. SLF 42 was used for research on getter strips, which were getting prepared to be used in LHC's vacuum chambers.

LPI's final success was the PARRNe experiment: The electrons provided by LPI-generated gamma rays, which were used to create neutron-rich radioactive krypton and xenon atoms.
