= Kate Scholberg =

Canadian American physicist

- Education: McGill University (B.Sc.), California Institute of Technology (M.S., Ph.D)
- Known for: Supernova Neutrino Astronomy, Neutrino Oscillations
- Scientific career
- Fields: Particle Physics, Astrophysics, Neutrinos
- Institutions: Duke University
- Thesis: "A Search for Neutrinos from Gravitational Collapse with the MACRO Experiment"
- Doctoral advisors: Charles W. Peck and Barry Barish
- Website: Official website

Kate Scholberg is a Canadian and American neutrino physicist whose research has included experimental studies of neutrino oscillation, coherent elastic neutrino-nucleus scattering and the detection of supernovae. She is currently the Arts & Sciences Distinguished Professor of Physics and Bass Fellow at Duke University.

== Education and career ==
As a child in Canada, Scholberg was interested in astronomy from a young age, but as a teenager she became interested in chemistry and entered college planning to become a chemist. However, after a bad experience in an organic chemistry course, she changed her focus to physics. She graduated with a B.Sc. from McGill University in 1989, and completed her M.S. and Ph.D. at the California Institute of Technology in 1996, under the joint supervision of Charles W. Peck and Barry Barish. Her interest in neutrino physics developed out of her graduate work; thesis titled "A Search for Neutrinos from Gravitational Collapse with the MACRO Experiment". The MACRO experiment was originally designed to search for magnetic monopoles, at the Laboratori Nazionali del Gran Sasso in Italy.

After postdoctoral research at Boston University, and a junior faculty position at the Massachusetts Institute of Technology, she moved to Duke University in 2004. Before becoming Arts & Sciences Distinguished Professor of Physics at Duke, she was the Anne T. and Robert M. Bass Professor of Physics there.

== Research collaborations ==
Scholberg is a researcher in the Super-Kamiokande and Tokai-to-Kamioka (T2K) collaborations, the Deep Underground Neutrino Experiment (DUNE), and the COHERENT detector at the Spallation Neutron Source of the Oak Ridge National Laboratory. She has also been instrumental in the development and coordination of the SuperNova Early Warning System.

== Recognition ==
In 2013 Scholberg was named a Fellow of the American Physical Society (APS), after a nomination by the APS Division of Particles and Fields, "for work with atmospheric and accelerator neutrinos that established the phenomenon of neutrino oscillation, and for leadership in the worldwide effort of the supernova neutrino detection". She was elected a member of the U.S. National Academy of Sciences in May 2022. In 2023 Scholberg was awarded Fellow of the American Association for the Advancement of Science.
