= Linear Collider Collaboration =

Organization coordinating particle physics research efforts

- Designing the world's next great particle accelerator
- Abbreviation: LCC
- Formation: March 22, 2013; 12 years ago
- Founder: International Committee on Future Accelerators
- Type: Non-governmental organization
- Purpose: Scientific collaboration between International Linear Collider and Compact Linear Collider
- Linear Collider Director: Lyn Evans

The Linear Collider Collaboration (LCC) is an organization designated by the International Committee for Future Accelerators (ICFA), a working group of the International Union of Pure and Applied Physics, to coordinate global research and development efforts for two next-generation particle physics colliders: the International Linear Collider (ILC) and the Compact Linear Collider (CLIC). The mission of the LCC is to facilitate decisions that the next collider "will be built, and where". Members of the collaboration include approximately 2000 accelerator and particle physicists, engineers and other scientists.

In June 2012 ICFA named Lyn Evans, the former project manager of the CERN Large Hadron Collider, as Linear Collider Director. CERN Courier noted, "Evans is the first to hold this new position, which is to lead the Linear Collider organization, created to bring the two existing large-scale linear collider programmes under one governance." He will "lead the effort to unify these programmes and will represent this combined effort to the worldwide science community and funding agencies."
