= Global Design Effort =

Team tasked with designing the International Linear Collider

The Global Design Effort (GDE) was an international team tasked with designing the International Linear Collider (ILC), a particle accelerator to succeed machines such as the Large Hadron Collider (LHC) and the Stanford Linear Accelerator (SLAC), with the endorsement of the International Committee for Future Accelerators. Between 2005–2013, the GDE led planning, research and development, and produced an ILC Technical Design Report.

The Global Design Effort was headed by Barry Barish of Caltech, former director of the LIGO laboratory.
