= Monopole, Astrophysics and Cosmic Ray Observatory =

Former particle physics experiment in Abruzzo, Italy (1989–2000)

MACRO (Monopole, Astrophysics and Cosmic Ray Observatory) was a particle physics experiment located at the Laboratori Nazionali del Gran Sasso in Abruzzo, Italy. MACRO was proposed by 6 scientific institutions in the United States and 6 Italian institutions.

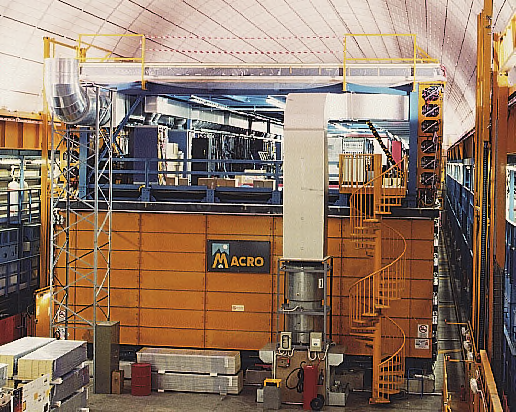
MACRO main hall

The primary goal of MACRO was to search for magnetic monopoles. The active elements of MACRO were liquid scintillator and streamer tubes, optimized for high resolution tracking and timing. This design also allowed MACRO to operate as a neutrino detector and as a cosmic ray observatory.

The experiment operated from 1989 to 2000. No monopole candidates were detected, meaning that the flux of monopoles is less than 1.4×10^{−16} per square centimetre per steradian per second (cm^{−2}sr^{−1}s^{−1}) for velocities between 0.0001 c and 1 c (between 30000 m/s and 300000000 m/s).

The magnetic monopole is a theorized particle that has not yet been observed. If detected, it would disprove Gauss's law for magnetism, one of the four Maxwell's equations which describe the well-established modern understanding of electricity and magnetism.

One researcher claimed to have observed a monopole with a light-bulb-sized detector. The fact that a detector the size of multiple football pitches (MACRO) has not yet duplicated this feat leads most to disregard the earlier claim.

The MACRO project included a large cavern, approximately 800 metres underground, which was further hollowed out and housed hundreds of long chambers filled with scintillating fluid – a fluid that gives off photons when a charged or magnetic particle passes through it. At opposing ends of the chamber were a pair of photomultiplier tubes. Photomultiplier tubes contain a number of small charged "plates". They look like flood lights, but they are collectors that can take a handful of photons and "multiply" them. This multiplication begins by using the photo-electric effect to convert photons that hit the first "plate" into electrons. These electrons are then attracted to the next plate which gives off more electrons that it receives. The next plate does the same, thus amplifying the signal more at each plate. The photomultipliers used in the MACRO experiment were produced by Thorn-EMI, and were sensitive to a signal as small as five photons. After decommissioning, MACRO donated about 800 photomultiplier tubes to the Daya Bay Reactor Neutrino Experiment. The exact voltage put on each plate was determined by a custom circuit board designed by some of the scientists involved with the project.

The scintillating chambers were assembled into high stacks and long rows. When a signal was detected, it was usually detected in multiple chambers. The timing of each signal from each photomultiplier told the approximate path and speed of the particle. The type of signal and the speed through the "pool" of chambers told researchers if they had observed a monopole or merely some common charged particle.

Very important results were obtained by MACRO in other sectors:

1. cosmic rays: flux, composition and shadow of the Sun and the Moon;
2. search for dark matter (WIMPS) from the center of the Sun and the Earth and dark matter with strange quarks;
3. search for low energy neutrinos from supernovae;
4. neutrino astronomy and neutrino oscillations.

In particular, MACRO showed evidence of neutrino oscillations at the Takayama neutrino conference immediately before the announcement of the discovery of oscillations by the Super-Kamiokande experiment.
