= Large Electron–Positron Collider =

Particle accelerator at CERN, Switzerland

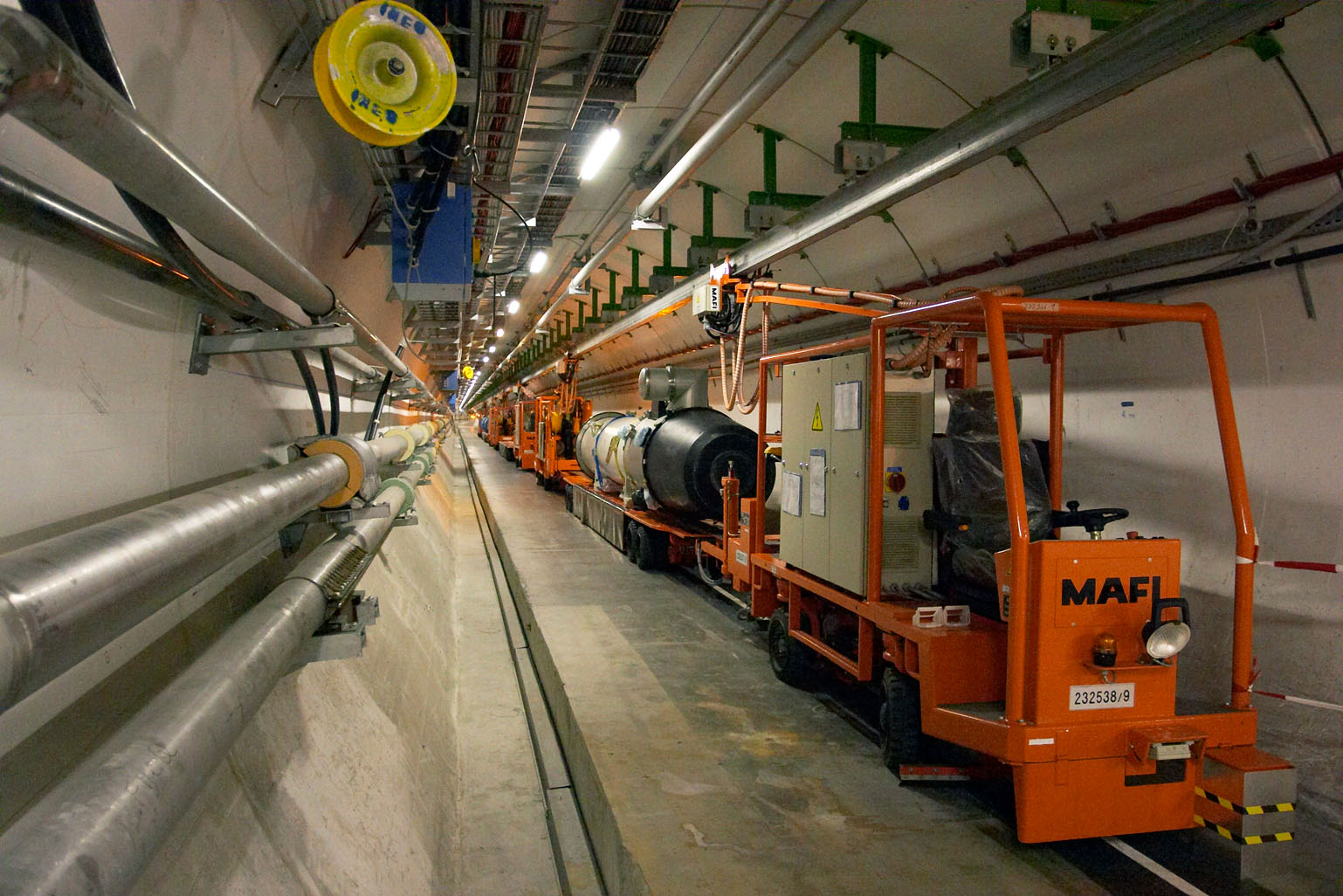
- The former LEP tunnel at CERN being filled with magnets for the Large Hadron Collider.

General properties
- Accelerator type: Synchrotron
- Beam type: Electrons, positrons
- Target type: Collider

Beam properties
- Maximum energy: 209 GeV
- Maximum current: 6.2 mA
- Maximum luminosity: 1×10^{32}/(cm^{2}⋅s)

Physical properties
- Circumference: 26659 m
- Location: Geneva, Switzerland
- Coordinates: 46°14′06″N 06°02′42″E
- Institution: CERN
- Dates of operation: 1989–2000
- Succeeded by: Large Hadron Collider

The Large Electron–Positron Collider (LEP) was one of the largest particle accelerators ever constructed. It was built at CERN, a multi-national centre for research in nuclear and particle physics near Geneva, Switzerland.

LEP collided electrons with positrons at energies that reached 209 GeV. It was a circular collider with a circumference of 27 kilometres built in a tunnel roughly 100 m (300 ft) underground and passing through Switzerland and France. LEP was used from 1989 until 2000. Around 2001 it was dismantled to make way for the Large Hadron Collider, which re-used the LEP tunnel. To date, LEP is the most powerful accelerator of leptons ever built.

== Collider background ==
LEP was a circular lepton collider – the most powerful such ever built. For context, modern colliders can be generally categorized based on their shape (circular or linear) and on what types of particles they accelerate and collide (leptons or hadrons). Leptons are point particles and are relatively light. Because they are point particles, their collisions are clean and amenable to precise measurements; however, because they are light, the collisions cannot reach the same energy that can be achieved with heavier particles. Hadrons are composite particles (composed of quarks) and are relatively heavy; protons, for example, have a mass 2000 times greater than electrons. Because of their higher mass, they can be accelerated to much higher energies, which is the key to directly observing new particles or interactions that are not predicted by currently accepted theories. However, hadron collisions are very messy (there are often many unrelated tracks, for example, and it is not straightforward to determine the energy of the collisions), and therefore more challenging to analyze and less amenable to precision measurements.

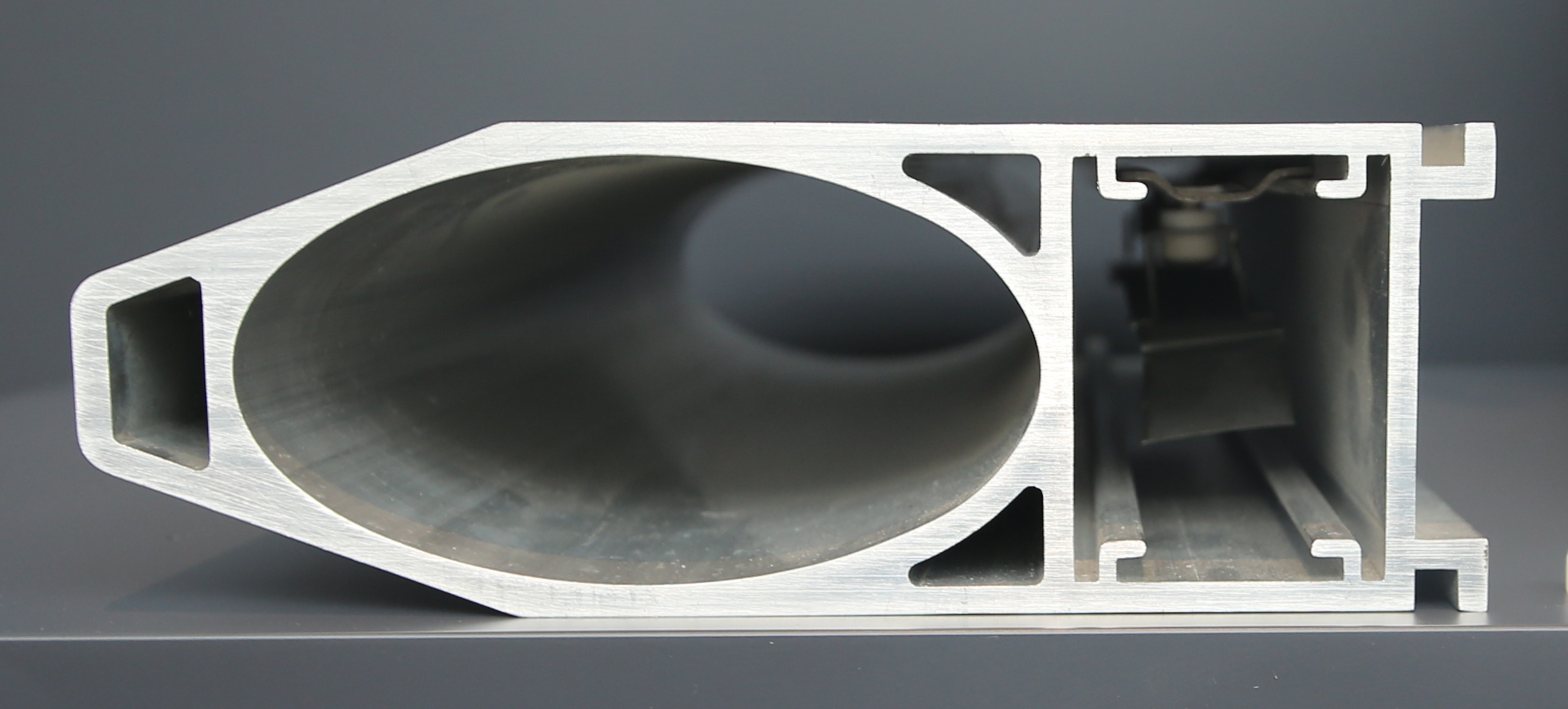
A section of the LEP Particle beam tube

The shape of the collider is also important. High energy physics colliders collect particles into bunches, and then collide the bunches together. However, only a very tiny fraction of particles in each bunch actually collide. In circular colliders, these bunches travel around a roughly circular shape in opposite directions and therefore can be collided over and over. This enables a high rate of collisions and facilitates collection of a large amount of data, which is important for precision measurements or for observing very rare decays. However, the energy of the bunches is limited due to losses from synchrotron radiation. In linear colliders, particles move in a straight line and therefore do not suffer from synchrotron radiation, but bunches cannot be re-used and it is therefore more challenging to collect large amounts of data.

As a circular lepton collider, LEP was well suited for precision measurements of the electroweak interaction at energies that were not previously achievable.

== History ==
Construction of the LEP was a significant undertaking. Between 1983–1988, it was the largest civil engineering project in Europe.

When the LEP collider started operation in August 1989 it accelerated the electrons and positrons to a total energy of 45 GeV each to enable production of the Z boson, which has a mass of 91 GeV. The accelerator was upgraded later to enable production of a pair of W bosons, each having a mass of 80 GeV. LEP collider energy eventually topped at 209 GeV at the end in 2000. At a Lorentz factor ( = particle energy/rest mass = [104.5 GeV/0.511 MeV]) of over 200,000, LEP still holds the particle accelerator speed record, extremely close to the limiting speed of light. At the end of 2000, LEP was shut down and then dismantled in order to make room in the tunnel for the construction of the Large Hadron Collider (LHC).

== Operation ==
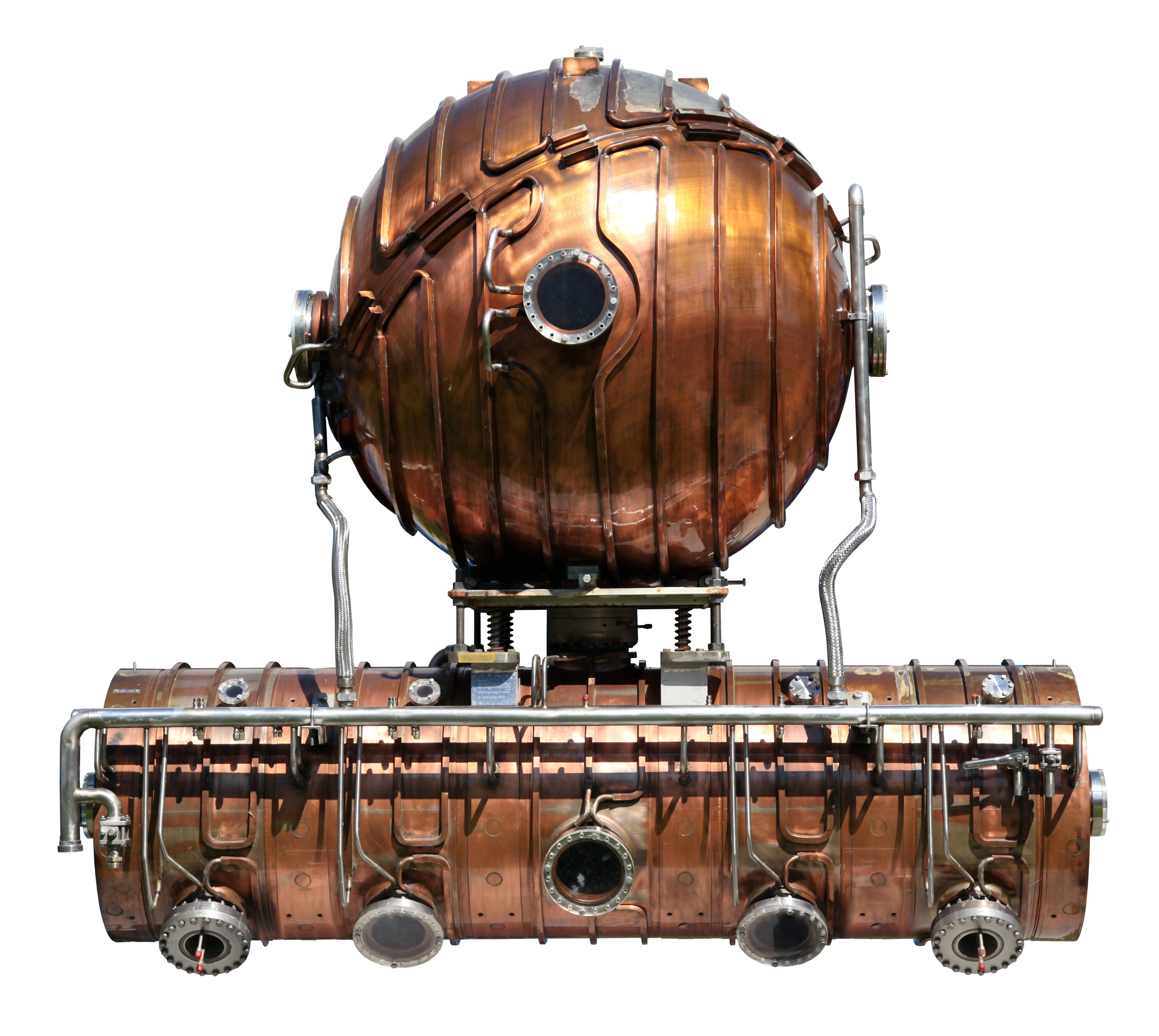
An old RF cavity from LEP, now on display at the Microcosm exhibit at CERN

LEP was fed with electrons and positrons delivered by CERN's accelerator complex. The particles were generated and initially accelerated by the LEP Pre-Injector, and further accelerated to nearly the speed of light by the Proton Synchrotron and the Super Proton Synchrotron. From there, they were injected into the LEP ring.

As in all ring colliders, the LEP's ring consisted of many magnets which forced the charged particles into a circular trajectory (so that they stay inside the ring), RF accelerators which accelerated the particles with radio frequency waves, and quadrupoles that focussed the particle beam (i.e. keep the particles together). The function of the accelerators was to increase the particles' energies so that heavy particles can be created when the particles collide. When the particles were accelerated to maximum energy (and focused to so-called bunches), an electron and a positron bunch were made to collide with each other at one of the collision points of the detector. When an electron and a positron collide, they annihilate to a virtual particle, either a photon or a Z boson. The virtual particle almost immediately decays into other elementary particles, which are then detected by huge particle detectors.

== Detectors ==
The Large Electron–Positron Collider had four detectors, built around the four collision points within underground halls. Each was the size of a small house and was capable of registering the particles by their energy, momentum and charge, thus allowing physicists to infer the particle reaction that had happened and the elementary particles involved. By performing statistical analysis of this data, knowledge about elementary particle physics is gained. The four detectors of LEP were called Aleph, Delphi, Opal, and L3. They were built differently to allow for complementary experiments.

=== ALEPH ===
ALEPH stands for Apparatus for LEP PHysics at CERN. The detector determined the mass of the W-boson and Z-boson to within one part in a thousand. The number of families of particles with light neutrinos was determined to be 2.982±0.013, which is consistent with the Standard Model value of 3. The running of the quantum chromodynamics (QCD) coupling constant was measured at various energies and found to run in accordance with perturbative calculations in QCD.

=== DELPHI ===
DELPHI stands for DEtector with Lepton, Photon and Hadron Identification. The DELPHI detector was known for its innovative technologies. For example, it had the world largest superconducting coil at the time, and it was the first detector which had a Ring Imaging Cherenkov (RICH) detector for particle identification. DELPHI was the first HEP experiment which used neural networks for data analysis. In 2024, the collaboration released their full data set as open data. The barrel part of the detector (without muon chambers) has been preserved in the experiment cavern and can be visited as part of the tour to LHCb.

=== OPAL ===
OPAL stands for Omni-Purpose Apparatus for LEP. The name of the experiment was a play on words, as some of the founding members of the scientific collaboration which first proposed the design had previously worked on the JADE detector at DESY in Hamburg. OPAL was a general-purpose detector designed to collect a broad range of data. Its data were used to make high precision measurements of the Z boson lineshape, perform detailed tests of the Standard Model, and place limits on new physics. The detector was dismantled in 2000 to make way for LHC equipment. The lead glass blocks from the OPAL barrel electromagnetic calorimeter are currently being re-used in the large-angle photon veto detectors at the NA62 experiment at CERN.

=== L3 ===
L3 was another LEP experiment. Its enormous octagonal magnet return yoke remained in place in the cavern and became part of the ALICE detector for the LHC.

== Results ==
The results of the LEP experiments allowed precise values of many quantities of the Standard Model—most importantly the mass of the Z boson and the W boson (which were discovered in 1983 at an earlier CERN collider, the Proton-Antiproton Collider) to be obtained—and so confirm the Model and put it on a solid basis of empirical data.

== Higgs boson ==
Near the end of the scheduled run time, data suggested tantalizing but inconclusive hints that the Higgs particle of a mass around 115 GeV might have been observed, a sort of Holy Grail of current high-energy physics. The run-time was extended for a few months, to no avail. The strength of the signal remained at 1.7 standard deviations which translates to the 91% confidence level, much less than the confidence expected by particle physicists to claim a discovery, and was at the extreme upper edge of the detection range of the experiments with the collected LEP data. There was a proposal to extend the LEP operation by another year in order to seek confirmation, which would have delayed the start of the LHC. However, the decision was made to shut down LEP and progress with the LHC as planned.

For years, this observation was the only hint of a Higgs Boson; subsequent experiments until 2010 at the Tevatron had not been sensitive enough to confirm or refute these hints. Beginning in July 2012, however, the ATLAS and CMS experiments at LHC presented evidence of a Higgs particle around 125 GeV, and strongly excluded the 115 GeV region.

== See also ==
- Electron–positron annihilation
- Large Hadron Collider
