= Three-jet event =

Phenomenon in particle physics

In particle physics, a three-jet event is an event with many particles in final state that appear to be clustered in three jets. A single jet consists of particles that fly off in roughly the same direction. One can draw three cones from the interaction point, corresponding to the jets, and most particles created in the reaction will appear to belong to one of these cones. These events are currently the most direct available evidence for the existence of gluons, and were first observed by the TASSO experiment at the PETRA accelerator at the DESY laboratory.

Since jets are ordinarily produced when quarks hadronize, and quarks are produced only in pairs, an additional particle is required to explain events containing an odd number of jets. Quantum chromodynamics indicates that this particle is a particularly energetic gluon, radiated by one of the quarks, which hadronizes much as a quark does.

A particularly striking feature of these events, which were first observed at DESY and studied in great detail by experiments at the LEP collider, is their consistency with the Lund string model. The model indicates that "strings" of low-energy gluons will form most strongly between the quarks and the high-energy gluons, and that the "breaking" of these strings into new quark–antiquark pairs (part of the hadronization process) will result in some "stray" hadrons between the jets (and in the same plane). Since the quark-gluon interaction is stronger than the quark-quark interaction, such hadrons will be observed much less frequently between the two quark jets. As a result, the model predicts that stray hadrons will not appear between two of the jets, but will appear between each of them and the third. This is precisely what is observed.

As a check, physicists have also considered events with a photon produced in a similar process. In this case, the quark–quark interaction is the only strong interaction, so a "string" forms between the two quarks, and stray hadrons now appear between the corresponding jets. This difference between the three-jet events and the two-jet events with a high-energy photon, which indicates that the third jet has unique properties under the strong interaction, can only be explained by the original particle in that jet being a gluon.

The line of reasoning is illustrated below. The drawings are not Feynman diagrams; they are "snapshots" in time and show two spatial dimensions.

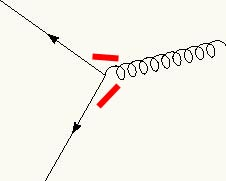
Two quarks (solid lines) and a gluon (curly line) fly apart, with the strings (red bars) primarily between the gluon and each quark.

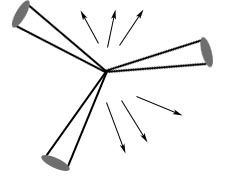
As a result, three jets (cones) form, with extra hadrons (arrows) found where the strings formed.

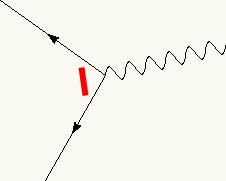
For comparison, physicists looked at events with two quarks and a photon (wavy line). Here the string forms only between quarks.

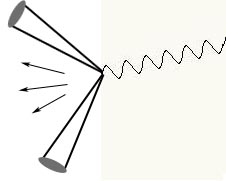
Therefore, extra hadrons are found only between the two jets, which is inconsistent with observations.

== Ellis–Karliner angle ==
The Ellis–Karliner angle is the kinematic angle between the highest energy jets in a three-jet event. The angle is not measured in the lab frame, but in a frame boosted along the energy of the highest energy jet so that the second and third jets are back-to-back. By measuring the distribution of the Ellis–Karliner angle at the PETRA electron–positron storage ring at DESY, physicists determined that the gluon has spin one rather than spin zero or spin two. Subsequent experiments at the LEP storage ring at CERN confirmed this result.
