= 1/N expansion =

Perturbative analysis of quantum field theories

How a three gluon vertex would appear in 't Hooft's double index notation. This makes the analogy to a string theory that will appear at large N apparent.
Examples
1	2

In quantum field theory and statistical mechanics, the 1/N expansion, also known as the large N expansion, is the mathematical treatment of a hypothetical fundamental interaction with a large number N of possible charges. This technique is used in quantum chromodynamics (even though $N$ is only 3 there indicating the number of color charges) with the gauge group SU(3). Using a perturbative approach, this expansion allows to construct quantum field theories with the special orthogonal group SO(N) or the special unitary group SU(N) as their internal symmetry group. It consists in deriving an expansion for the properties of the theory in powers of $1/N$, which is treated as a small parameter.

Another application in particle physics is to the study of AdS/CFT correspondence. It is also extensively used in condensed matter physics where it can be used to provide a rigorous basis for mean-field theory.

This expansion technique was first introduced by Gerard 't Hooft in 1974 in an attempt to recast quantum chromodynamics as a string theory.

== Example ==
Starting with a quartic interaction φ^{4}, the scalar field φ takes on values in the real vector representation of the orthogonal group O(N). Using the index notation for the N "flavors" with the Einstein summation convention and because O(N) is orthogonal, no distinction will be made between covariant and contravariant indices. The Lagrangian density is given by

$$\mathcal{L}={1\over 2}\partial^\mu \phi_a \partial_\mu \phi_a-{m^2\over 2}\phi_a \phi_a-{\lambda\over 8N}(\phi_a \phi_a)^2$$

where $a$ runs from 1 to N. Note that N has been absorbed into the coupling strength λ. This is crucial here.

Introducing an auxiliary field F;

$$\mathcal{L}={1\over 2}\partial^\mu \phi_a \partial_\mu \phi_a -{m^2\over 2}\phi_a \phi_a +{1\over 2}F^2-{\sqrt{\lambda /N}\over 2}F \phi_a \phi_a$$

In the Feynman diagrams, the graph breaks up into disjoint cycles, each made up of φ edges of the same flavor and the cycles are connected by F edges (which have no propagator line as auxiliary fields do not propagate).

Each 4-point vertex contributes λ/N and hence, 1/N. Each flavor cycle contributes N because there are N such flavors to sum over. Note that not all momentum flow cycles are flavor cycles.

At least perturbatively, the dominant contribution to the 2k-point connected correlation function is of the order (1/N)^{k-1} and the other terms are higher powers of 1/N. Performing a 1/N expansion gets more and more accurate in the large N limit. The vacuum energy density is proportional to N, but can be ignored due to non-compliance with general relativity assumptions.

Due to this structure, a different graphical notation to denote the Feynman diagrams can be used. Each flavor cycle can be represented by a vertex. The flavor paths connecting two external vertices are represented by a single vertex. The two external vertices along the same flavor path are naturally paired and can be replaced by a single vertex and an edge (not an F edge) connecting it to the flavor path. The F edges are edges connecting two flavor cycles/paths to each other (or a flavor cycle/path to itself). The interactions along a flavor cycle/path have a definite cyclic order and represent a special kind of graph where the order of the edges incident to a vertex matters, but only up to a cyclic permutation, and since this is a theory of real scalars, also an order reversal (but if we have SU(N) instead of SU(2), order reversals aren't valid). Each F edge is assigned a momentum (the momentum transfer) and there is an internal momentum integral associated with each flavor cycle.

== Quantum chromodynamics ==
Quantum chromodynamics (QCD) is an SU(3) gauge theory involving gluons and quarks. The left-handed quarks belong to a triplet representation, the right-handed to an antitriplet representation (after charge-conjugating them) and the gluons to a real adjoint representation. A quark edge is assigned a color and orientation and a gluon edge is assigned a color pair.

In the large N limit, we only consider the dominant term. See AdS/CFT.
