= Boris Struminsky =

Boris Vladimirovich Struminsky
- Born: Борис Владимирович Струминский; August 14, 1939; Malakhovka, Moscow Oblast, Russia, USSR
- Died: January 18, 2003 (aged 63); Kyiv, Ukraine
- Education: Moscow State University
- Scientific career
- Fields: Theoretical physics, elementary particle physics
- Workplaces: Steklov Institute of Mathematics; Joint Institute for Nuclear Research; Bogolyubov Institute for Theoretical Physics
- Doctoral advisor: Nikolay Bogolyubov

Boris Vladimirovich Struminsky (Russian: Борис Владимирович Струминский; 14 August 1939 – 18 January 2003) was a Russian and Ukrainian physicist known for his contribution to theoretical elementary particle physics.

== Biography ==
Boris Struminsky was born on 14 August 1939 in Malakhovka, a settlement in Ukhtomsky District (now Lyuberetsky District), Moscow Oblast, RSFSR, USSR. His father was academician Vladimir Vasilyevich Struminsky (1914—1998).

After finishing the school Boris Struminsky started his studies at Faculty of Physics of Moscow State University, which he graduated in 1962.

From 1962 to 1965 Struminsky was a doctoral student at Steklov Institute of Mathematics in Moscow. From 1965 he continued his work at the same institute as a junior researcher. In 1965 he successfully defended his doctoral (C.Sc.) thesis devoted to Higher-order symmetries and composite models of elementary particles.

In 1966 Struminsky started his work at Joint Institute for Nuclear Research in Dubna, first as a researcher, and then, from 1967, as a senior researcher of the Laboratory of Theoretical Physics.

In 1971 Boris Struminsky moved to Institute for Theoretical Physics of the Academy of Science of the Ukrainian SSR (now Bogolyubov Institute for Theoretical Physics of the National Academy of Sciences of Ukraine) in Kyiv, where he worked until the end of his life, first as a senior researcher, and then as a leading researcher. In 1973 Struminsky successfully defended his D.Sc. thesis devoted to Finite energy sum rules and the dual resonance model.

== Research ==
The main scientific results of Boris Struminsky are related to the quark structure of hadrons — elementary particles held together by the strong force. His 1965 paper contained an idea to introduce a new quantum number for the quarks, which was later called a color charge. Later on, this has become one of the basic ideas of quantum chromodynamics — the theory describing strong interaction of elementary particles.

Many papers by Boris Struminsky deal with various problems related to the structure of hadrons, as well as interaction of hadrons and nuclei. He published about 100 papers devoted to these topics.

== Recognition of the discovery: Sociological aspect ==
In 1988 the group of scientists (A.M. Baldin, P.N. Bogolyubov, V.A. Matveev, A.N. Tavkhelidze, R.M. Muradyan) was awarded the Lenin Prize "for a cycle of works on the "New quantum number — color charge and establishment of dynamic regularities in the quark structure of elementary particles and atomic nuclei" (1965—1977)". (See: Lenin Prize Laureates for 1988)

B. V. Struminsky, who discovered a new quantum number — color charge — was not awarded the Lenin Prize "for a cycle of works on the "New quantum number — color charge..." (1965—1977)".

This situation is so striking that it requires a more detailed description in terms of the sociology of science.

== Selected papers ==
- B.V. Struminsky, Magnetic moments of baryons in the quark model (in English) JINR Publication P-1939, Dubna, 1965
- N.N. Bogolyubov, B.V. Struminsky, and A.N. Tavkhelidze, On the composite models in theories of elementary particles, JINR Publication D-1968, Dubna, 1965
- B.V. Struminsky and A.N. Tavkhelidze, Quarks and composite models of elementary particles (in Russian), in: High Energy Physics and Elementary Particles Theory, pp. 625–634. Naukova Dumka, Kyiv, 1967
- V.A. Matveev, B.V. Struminsky, and A.N. Tavkhelidze, Dispersion sum rules and SU(3) symmetry, Physics Letters, 22, No.2, 146, 1966
- A.N. Vall, L.L. Jenkovszky, and B.V. Struminsky, High energy hadron interactions, Soviet Journal of Particles and Nuclei (ЭЧАЯ), 19, p. 180—223, 1988
