= Lund string model =

Model of hadronization

In particle physics, the Lund string model is a phenomenological model of hadronization. It treats all but the highest-energy gluons as field lines, which are attracted to each other due to the gluon self-interaction and so form a narrow tube (or string) of strong color field. (Electromagnetic field lines do not stringify, but instead spread out, because the photon, carrier of the electromagnetic force, does not self-interact.)

The model is named after the particle theory group of Lund University, which developed it. It was derived from the 1977 PhD thesis of Carsten Peterson, supervised by Bo Andersson and Gösta Gustafson. The model was refined by the contributions of researchers of the group, like Torbjörn Sjöstrand, Bo Söderberg, Gunnar Ingelman, Hans-Uno Bengtsson, and Ulf Pettersson. In 1979, the model was able to describe gluon jet fragmentation by considering the force field to be similar to a massless relativistic string. The model successfully predicted a specific asymmetry in the particles produced in electron–positron collisions, observed in 1980.

String fragmentation is one of the parton fragmentation models used in the PYTHIA/Jetset and the University of California, Los Angeles as event generators, and explains many features of hadronization quite well. In particular, the model predicts that in addition to the particle jets formed along the original paths of two separating quarks, there will be a spray of hadrons produced between the jets by the string itself—which is precisely what is observed.

== See also ==
- QCD string
- Color confinement
