= Usha Mallik =

Indian-American experimental particle physicist (1947–2024)

Usha N. Mallik
- Born: 1947; Calcutta, British Raj
- Died: 4 August 2024 (aged 76–77); Solon, Iowa
- Education: City College of New York (PhD)
- Occupations: Particle physicist Educator
- Scientific career
- Workplaces: SLAC, DESY, CERN, University of Iowa
- Doctoral advisor: Sam J. Lindenbaum

Usha N. Mallik (1947 – 4 August 2024) was an Indian-American experimental particle physicist and professor at the University of Iowa. She conducted studies of fundamental physics and developed detector readout software for particle collider experiments at SLAC, DESY, and CERN.

== Biography ==
Mallik was born in Calcutta, India in 1947. She studied under Sam J. Lindenbaum at the City College of New York, and obtained a PhD in physics in 1978.

As a postdoc, Mallik worked on particle collider experiments at DESY in Hamburg, Germany and at the SLAC National Accelerator Laboratory in California, USA. At DESY, Mallik studied electron–positron collisions in the PETRA storage ring and electron–proton collisions from the HERA storage ring. In part for her measurements of the J/Psi meson there, Mallik was recognized as a fellow of the American Physical Society in 1996.

Mallik joined the University of Iowa as an assistant professor in 1989. In the early 2000s, her group worked on the BaBar experiment at SLAC. Starting in 2010, Mallik and her group began working on the ATLAS experiment at CERN's Large Hadron Collider.
