= JADE (particle detector) =

Particle detector

JADE was a particle detector at the PETRA particle accelerator at the German national laboratory DESY in Hamburg. It was operated from 1979 to 1986. JADE's most important scientific achievement was the discovery of the gluon in three-jet events. It also helped greatly in establishing quantum chromodynamics. JADE is an acronym for Japan, Deutschland (Germany) and England, the three countries from which the participating universities originated. The JADE jet chamber is now exhibited in the physics lecture hall at the University of Heidelberg. Although the last data with JADE were taken in 1986, analysis continued, with the most recent paper published in 2012. In 1995, the European Physical Society (EPS) awarded a "Special High Energy and Particle Physics Prize" to the JADE, PLUTO, TASSO and MARK-J collaborations at PETRA for "establishing the existence of the gluon in independent and simultaneous ways".
