= Gluon field strength tensor =

Second-rank tensor in quantum chromodynamics

In theoretical particle physics, the gluon field strength tensor is a second-order tensor field characterizing the gluon interaction between quarks.

The strong interaction is one of the fundamental interactions of nature, and the quantum field theory (QFT) to describe it is called quantum chromodynamics (QCD). Quarks interact with each other by the strong force due to their color charge, mediated by gluons. Gluons themselves possess color charge and can mutually interact.

The gluon field strength tensor is a rank-2 tensor field on the spacetime with values in the adjoint bundle of the chromodynamical SU(3) gauge group (see vector bundle for necessary definitions).

== Convention ==
Throughout this article, Latin indices (typically a, b, c, n) take values 1, 2, ..., 8 for the eight gluon color charges, while Greek indices (typically α, β, μ, ν) take values 0 for timelike components and 1, 2, 3 for spacelike components of four-vectors and four-dimensional spacetime tensors. In all equations, the summation convention is used on all color and tensor indices, unless the text explicitly states that there is no sum to be taken (e.g. "no sum").

== Definition ==
Below the definitions (and most of the notation) follow K. Yagi, T. Hatsuda, Y. Miake and Greiner, Schäfer.

=== Tensor components ===
The tensor is denoted G, (or F, F̅, or some variant), and has components defined proportional to the commutator of the quark covariant derivative D_{μ}:
$$G_{\alpha\beta} = \pm \frac{1}{i g_\text{s}} [D_\alpha, D_\beta],$$
where
$$D_\mu =\partial_\mu \pm ig_\text{s} t_a \mathcal{A}^a_\mu,$$
in which

i is the imaginary unit;
g_{s} is the coupling constant of the strong force;
t_{a} = λ_{a}/2 are the Gell-Mann matrices λ_{a} divided by 2;
a is a color index in the adjoint representation of SU(3) which take values 1, 2, ..., 8 for the eight generators of the group, namely the Gell-Mann matrices;
μ is a spacetime index, 0 for timelike components and 1, 2, 3 for spacelike components;
$\mathcal{A}_\mu = t_a \mathcal{A}^a_\mu$ expresses the gluon field, a spin-1 gauge field or, in differential-geometric parlance, a connection in the SU(3) principal bundle;
$\mathcal{A}_\mu$ are its four (coordinate-system-dependent) components, that in a fixed gauge are 3×3 traceless Hermitian matrix-valued functions, while $\mathcal{A}^a_\mu$ are 32 real-valued functions, the four components for each of the eight four-vector fields.

Note that different authors choose different signs.

Expanding the commutator gives
$$G_{\alpha\beta} = \partial_{\alpha}\mathcal{A}_\beta - \partial_\beta\mathcal{A}_\alpha \pm ig_\text{s}[\mathcal{A}_{\alpha}, \mathcal{A}_{\beta}].$$

Substituting $t_a \mathcal{A}^a_\alpha = \mathcal{A}_\alpha$ and using the commutation relation $[t_a, t_b ] = i f_{ab}{}^{c} t_c$ for the Gell-Mann matrices (with a relabeling of indices), in which f^{abc} are the structure constants of SU(3), each of the gluon field strength components can be expressed as a linear combination of the Gell-Mann matrices as follows:
$$\begin{align}
G_{\alpha \beta} &= \partial_\alpha t_a \mathcal{A}^a_\beta - \partial_\beta t_a \mathcal{A}^a_\alpha \pm i g_\text{s} [t_b, t_c] \mathcal{A}^b_\alpha \mathcal{A}^c_\beta \\
&= t_a \big(\partial_\alpha \mathcal{A}^a_\beta - \partial_\beta \mathcal{A}^a_\alpha \pm i^2 f_{bc}{}^ag_\text{s} \mathcal{A}^b_\alpha \mathcal{A}^c_\beta\big) \\
&= t_a G^a_{\alpha\beta}, \\
\end{align}$$
so that
$$G^a_{\alpha\beta} = \partial_\alpha \mathcal{A}^a_\beta - \partial_\beta \mathcal{A}^a_\alpha \mp g_\text{s} f^a{}_{bc} \mathcal{A}^b_\alpha \mathcal{A}^c_\beta,$$
where again a, b, c = 1, 2, ..., 8 are color indices. As with the gluon field, in a specific coordinate system and fixed gauge G_{αβ} are 3×3 traceless Hermitian matrix-valued functions, while G^{a}_{αβ} are real-valued functions, the components of eight four-dimensional second-order tensor fields.

=== Differential forms ===
The gluon color field can be described using the language of differential forms, specifically as an adjoint bundle-valued curvature 2-form (note that fibers of the adjoint bundle are the su(3) Lie algebra);
$$\mathbf{G} = \mathrm{d}\boldsymbol{\mathcal{A}} \mp g_\text{s}\,\boldsymbol{\mathcal{A}} \wedge \boldsymbol{\mathcal{A}},$$
where $\boldsymbol{\mathcal{A}}$ is the gluon field, a vector potential 1-form corresponding to G, and ∧ is the (antisymmetric) wedge product of this algebra, producing the structure constants f ^{abc}. The Cartan-derivative of the field form (i.e. essentially the divergence of the field) would be zero in the absence of the "gluon terms", i.e. those $\boldsymbol{\mathcal{A}}$ which represent the non-abelian character of the SU(3).

A more mathematically formal derivation of these same ideas (but a slightly altered setting) can be found in the article on metric connections.

=== Comparison with the electromagnetic tensor ===
This almost parallels the electromagnetic field tensor (also denoted F ) in quantum electrodynamics, given by the electromagnetic four-potential A describing a spin-1 photon:
$$F_{\alpha\beta} = \partial_{\alpha}A_{\beta} - \partial_{\beta}A_{\alpha},$$
or in the language of differential forms,
$$\mathbf{F} = \mathrm{d}\mathbf{A}.$$

The key difference between quantum electrodynamics and quantum chromodynamics is that the gluon field strength has extra terms which lead to self-interactions between the gluons and asymptotic freedom. This is a complication of the strong force making it inherently non-linear, contrary to the linear theory of the electromagnetic force. QCD is a non-abelian gauge theory. The word non-abelian in group-theoretical language means that the group operation is not commutative, making the corresponding Lie algebra non-trivial.

== QCD Lagrangian density ==
Characteristic of field theories, the dynamics of the field strength are summarized by a suitable Lagrangian density and substitution into the Euler–Lagrange equation (for fields) obtains the equation of motion for the field. The Lagrangian density for massless quarks, bound by gluons, is
$$\mathcal{L} = -\frac{1}{2} \operatorname{tr}(G_{\alpha\beta} G^{\alpha\beta}) + \bar{\psi}(iD_\mu) \gamma^\mu\psi,$$
where "tr" denotes trace of the 3×3 matrix G_{αβ}G^{αβ}, and γ^{μ} are the 4×4 gamma matrices. In the fermionic term $i\bar{\psi}(iD_\mu) \gamma^\mu \psi$, both color and spinor indices are suppressed. With indices explicit, $\psi_{i,\alpha}$, where $i = 1, \ldots, 3$ are color indices, and $\alpha = 1, \ldots, 4$ are Dirac spinor indices.

== Gauge transformations ==
In contrast to QED, the gluon field strength tensor is not gauge invariant by itself. Only the product of two contracted over all indices is gauge invariant.

== Equations of motion ==
Treated as a classical field theory, the equations of motion for the quark fields are
$$(i\hbar \gamma^\mu D_\mu - mc) \psi = 0,$$
which is like the Dirac equation, and the equations of motion for the gluon (gauge) fields are
$$[D_\mu, G^{\mu\nu}] = g_\text{s} j^\nu,$$
which are similar to the Maxwell equations (when written in tensor notation). More specifically, these are the Yang–Mills equations for quark and gluon fields. The color charge four-current is the source of the gluon field strength tensor, analogous to the electromagnetic four-current as the source of the electromagnetic tensor. It is given by
$$j^\nu = t^b  j_b^\nu, \quad j_b^\nu = \bar{\psi} \gamma^\nu t^b \psi,$$
which is a conserved current, since color charge is conserved. In other words, the color four-current must satisfy the continuity equation
$$D_\nu j^\nu = 0.$$

== See also ==
- Quark confinement
- Gell-Mann matrices
- Field (physics)
- Yang–Mills field
- Eightfold Way (physics)
- Einstein tensor
- Wilson loop
- Wess–Zumino gauge
- Quantum chromodynamics binding energy
- Ricci calculus
- Special unitary group
