= Color confinement =

Phenomenon in quantum chromodynamics

The colour force favors confinement because at a certain range it is more energetically favorable to create a quark–antiquark pair than to continue to elongate the color flux tube. This is analogous to the behavior of an elongated rubber-band.

An animation of color confinement. If energy is supplied to the quarks as shown, the gluon tube elongates until it reaches a point where it "snaps" and forms a quark–antiquark pair. Thus single quarks are never seen in isolation.

In quantum chromodynamics (QCD), color confinement or infrared slavery, is the phenomenon that color-charged particles (such as quarks and gluons) cannot be isolated, and therefore cannot be directly observed in normal conditions below the Hagedorn temperature of approximately 2 terakelvin (corresponding to energies of approximately 130–140 MeV per particle). Quarks and gluons must clump together to form hadrons. The two main types of hadron are the mesons (one quark, one antiquark) and the baryons (often three quarks or antiquarks, though other exotic variants exist). In addition, colorless glueballs formed only of gluons are also consistent with confinement, though difficult to identify experimentally. Quarks and gluons cannot be separated from their parent hadron without producing new hadrons.

== Origin ==
There is not yet an analytic proof of color confinement in any non-abelian gauge theory. The phenomenon can be understood qualitatively by noting that the force-carrying gluons of QCD have color charge, unlike the photons of quantum electrodynamics (QED). Whereas the electric field between electrically charged particles decreases rapidly as those particles are separated, the gluon field between a pair of color charges forms a narrow flux tube (or string) between them. Because of this behavior of the gluon field, the strong force between the particles is constant regardless of their separation.

Therefore, as two color charges are separated, at some point it becomes energetically favorable for a new quark–antiquark pair to appear, rather than extending the tube further. As a result of this, when quarks are produced in particle accelerators, instead of seeing the individual quarks in detectors, scientists see "jets" of many color-neutral particles (mesons and baryons), clustered together. This process is called hadronization, fragmentation, or string breaking.

The confining phase is usually defined by the behavior of the action of the Wilson loop, which is simply the path in spacetime traced out by a quark–antiquark pair created at one point and annihilated at another point. In a non-confining theory, the action of such a loop is proportional to its perimeter. However, in a confining theory, the action of the loop is instead proportional to its area. Since the area is proportional to the separation of the quark–antiquark pair, free quarks are suppressed. Mesons are allowed in such a picture, since a loop containing another loop with the opposite orientation has only a small area between the two loops. At non-zero temperatures, the order operator for confinement are thermal versions of Wilson loops known as Polyakov loops.

== Confinement scale ==
The confinement scale or QCD scale is the scale at which the perturbatively defined strong coupling constant diverges. This is known as the Landau pole. The confinement scale definition and value therefore depend on the renormalization scheme used. For example, in the MS-bar scheme and at 4-loop in the running of $\alpha_s$, the world average in the 3-flavour case is given by

$$\Lambda^{(3)}_\overline{MS} = (332 \pm 17) \,\rm{MeV} \,.$$

When the renormalization group equation is solved exactly, the scale is not defined at all. It is therefore customary to quote the value of the strong coupling constant at a particular reference scale instead.

It is sometimes believed that the sole origin of confinement is the very large value of the strong coupling near the Landau pole. This is sometimes referred as infrared slavery (a term chosen to contrast with the ultraviolet freedom). It is however incorrect since in QCD the Landau pole is unphysical, which can be seen by the fact that its position at the confinement scale largely depends on the chosen renormalization scheme, i.e., on a convention. Most evidence points to a moderately large coupling, typically of value 1-3 depending on the choice of renormalization scheme. In contrast to the simple but erroneous mechanism of infrared slavery, a large coupling is but one ingredient for color confinement, the other one being that gluons are color-charged and can therefore collapse into gluon tubes.

== Models exhibiting confinement ==
In addition to QCD in four spacetime dimensions, the two-dimensional Schwinger model also exhibits confinement. Compact Abelian gauge theories also exhibit confinement in 2 and 3 spacetime dimensions. Confinement has been found in elementary excitations of magnetic systems called spinons.

If the electroweak symmetry breaking scale were lowered, the unbroken SU(2) interaction would eventually become confining. Alternative models where SU(2) becomes confining above that scale are quantitatively similar to the Standard Model at lower energies, but dramatically different above symmetry breaking.

== Models of fully screened quarks ==
Besides the quark confinement idea, there is a potential possibility that the color charge of quarks gets fully screened by the gluonic color surrounding the quark. Exact solutions of SU(3) classical Yang–Mills theory which provide full screening (by gluon fields) of the color charge of a quark have been found. However, such classical solutions do not take into account non-trivial properties of QCD vacuum. Therefore, the significance of such full gluonic screening solutions for a separated quark is not clear.

== See also ==
- Lund string model
- Gluon field strength tensor
- Asymptotic freedom
- Beta function (physics)
- Yang–Mills existence and mass gap
- Cornell potential § Calculation of the quark-quark potential
- Lattice gauge theory
- Dual superconductor model
- Center vortex
