= PLUTO detector =

PLUTO was a detector for experimental high-energy particle physics at the German national laboratory DESY in Hamburg. It was operated from 1974 to 1978 at the DORIS synchrotron and was substantially upgraded between 1977 and 1978 for operation at the PETRA accelerator, where it took data until 1979.

== Detector ==
PLUTO used the first electromagnetic superconductive solenoid in the world, with a very uniform axial magnetic field of 1.2 tesla (Note: Such magnets were later used for Nuclear Magnetic Resonance (NMR) spectroscopy for medical analysis), to operate in a straight section of electron–positron accelerators at DESY, first with DORIS I (a storage ring with center-of-mass energies of ~3–5 GeV) in 1974–1976, then with DORIS II (the upgraded DORIS storage ring at center-of-mass energies of ~7–10 Gev) in 1978 and later with PETRA (also a storage ring, at larger center-of-mass energies of ~10–45 GeV) in 1978–1982.

== Experimental results ==
The PLUTO collaboration started with about 35 physicists from institutes of Aachen, DESY, Hamburg, Wuppertal and Siegen in Germany and subsequently gained new members from universities in the US, UK, Italy and Israel. The collaboration investigated electron–positron physics in a wide range of partly unexplored energies, contributed to new physics by exploring the just discovered charm quark and tau lepton, added important knowledge to electroweak and strong interactions and discovered new phenomena, by demonstrating that:

- the Υ(9.46 GeV) is a very narrow bottom–antibottom new quark resonance (observed together with another experiment at DORIS),
- the Υ decays hadronically mostly (approx. 97%) into three gluons,
- gluons are fragmenting and hadronizing into jets (almost like quarks), seen as the three jets in the Υ hadronic decays,
- gluons have spin 1,
- gluon bremsstrahlung exists (found together with three more experiments at PETRA).

All of these led to the discovery of the gluon and of gluon jets and to the confirmation of the quantum chromodynamics (QCD) theory of strong interactions. (Note: See also review by Ali and Kramer concerning the first gluon evidence by PLUTO at DORIS, see page 247 and pages 264–268 (ch. 4: "Gluon Jets in Y decays")).)

A "Special High Energy and Particle Physics Prize" of the European Physical Society (EPS) was awarded in 1995 to the PLUTO, TASSO, MARK-J and JADE collaborations for "establishing the existence of the gluon in independent and simultaneous ways" (meant for the discovery of the gluon bremsstrahlung process at PETRA in 1979 by the four mentioned collaborations, and not for the discovery of the Υ → 3 gluons → 3 jets decay by PLUTO at DORIS in 1978.)
