= Carsten Peterson =

Swedish physicist (born 1945)

- Born: 4 October 1945 (age 80)
- Education: Lund University
- Known for: Lund string model
- Children: 1
- Awards: Göran Gustafsson Prize (1991), Edlund Prize (2007)
- Scientific career
- Fields: Particle physics Computational biology
- Workplaces: Lund University
- Thesis: Phenomenological investigations in hadron physics with emphasis on quark structure (1977)
- Website: http://home.thep.lu.se/~carsten/

Carsten Peterson (born in 1945), is a Swedish theoretical physicist and professor at Lund University. His current field of research is computational biology.

After finishing his PhD studies in theoretical physics at Lund University in 1977, Peterson worked as a postdoctoral researcher at NORDITA in Copenhagen (1978-1979) and at Stanford University (1980-1982) before returning to Lund. He has since then been active there, except for a sabbatical period (1986-1988) when he hold a Senior Scientist position at Microelectronics and Computer Technology Corporation in Austin, Texas. Peterson is a professor in theoretical physics and was elected to the Royal Swedish Academy of Sciences in 2006.

Peterson's field of research was originally theoretical particle physics and statistical mechanics. In the mid 1980s he switched interests into machine learning methods, mostly artificial neural networks (ANN), for pattern recognition and image processing as well as algorithms for difficult optimization problems. In particular, he mapped the latter onto spin systems in physics – a field that is now gaining attention when it comes to quantum computers. With regard to pattern recognition, he early on contributed with a learning algorithm for ANN, the mean field method to speed up the Boltzmann machine. His group in Lund were somewhat of pioneers when it came to clinical predictors using machine learning. Since the early 1990s he has mostly been active within the interface between physics and biology with focus on biomarkers for serious diseases as well as gene regulation – the latter often with a network perspective approached with mechanistic methods. His currently focused on how and when stem cells commit to become mature cells.

Peterson is keen on whenever possible confronting his computational results with the real world and his activities are often performed imbedded within experimental groups.

As his interests increasingly went beyond more conventional physics, he pioneered the formation of a Complex Systems division within theoretical physics at Lund University (1989), which later evolved into computational biology (2000).
