= Gluon field =

Quantum field giving rise to gluons

In theoretical particle physics, the gluon field is a four-vector field characterizing the propagation of gluons in the strong interaction between quarks. It plays the same role in quantum chromodynamics as the electromagnetic four-potential in quantum electrodynamics – the gluon field constructs the gluon field strength tensor.

Throughout this article, Latin indices take values 1, 2, ..., 8 for the eight gluon color charges, while Greek indices take values 0 for timelike components and 1, 2, 3 for spacelike components of four-dimensional vectors and tensors in spacetime. Throughout all equations, the summation convention is used on all color and tensor indices, unless explicitly stated otherwise.

== Introduction ==
Gluons can have eight colour charges so there are eight fields, in contrast to photons which are neutral and so there is only one photon field.

The gluon fields for each color charge each have a "timelike" component analogous to the electric potential, and three "spacelike" components analogous to the magnetic vector potential. Using similar symbols:

$$\boldsymbol{\mathcal{A}}^n(\mathbf{r}, t) = [ \underbrace{\mathcal{A}^n_0(\mathbf{r}, t)}_{\text{timelike}} , \underbrace{\mathcal{A}^n_1(\mathbf{r}, t), \mathcal{A}^n_2(\mathbf{r}, t), \mathcal{A}^n_3(\mathbf{r}, t)}_{\text{spacelike}} ] = [\phi^n (\mathbf{r}, t), \mathbf{A}^n (\mathbf{r}, t)]$$

where n = 1, 2, ... 8 are not exponents but enumerate the eight gluon color charges, and all components depend on the position vector r of the gluon and time t. Each $\mathcal{A}^a_\alpha$ is a scalar field, for some component of spacetime and gluon color charge.

The Gell-Mann matrices λ^{a} are eight 3 × 3 matrices which form matrix representations of the SU(3) group. They are also generators of the SU(3) group, in the context of quantum mechanics and field theory; a generator can be viewed as an operator corresponding to a symmetry transformation (see symmetry in quantum mechanics). These matrices play an important role in QCD as QCD is a gauge theory of the SU(3) gauge group obtained by taking the color charge to define a local symmetry: each Gell-Mann matrix corresponds to a particular gluon color charge, which in turn can be used to define color charge operators. Generators of a group can also form a basis for a vector space, so the overall gluon field is a "superposition" of all the color fields. In terms of the Gell-Mann matrices (divided by 2 for convenience),

$$t_a = \frac{\lambda_a}{2}\,,$$

the components of the gluon field are represented by 3 × 3 matrices, given by:

$$\mathcal{A}_{\alpha} = t_a \mathcal{A}^a_\alpha \equiv t_1 \mathcal{A}^1_\alpha + t_2 \mathcal{A}^2_\alpha + \cdots + t_8 \mathcal{A}^8_\alpha$$

or collecting these into a vector of four 3 × 3 matrices:

$$\boldsymbol{\mathcal{A}}(\mathbf{r}, t) = [\mathcal{A}_0(\mathbf{r}, t),\mathcal{A}_1(\mathbf{r}, t),\mathcal{A}_2(\mathbf{r}, t),\mathcal{A}_3(\mathbf{r}, t)]$$

the gluon field is:

$$\boldsymbol{\mathcal{A}} = t_a \boldsymbol{\mathcal{A}}^a \,.$$

== Gauge covariant derivative in QCD ==
Below the definitions (and most of the notation) follow K. Yagi, T. Hatsuda, Y. Miake and Greiner, Schäfer.

The gauge covariant derivative D_{μ} is required to transform quark fields in manifest covariance; the partial derivatives that form the four-gradient ∂_{μ} alone are not enough. The components which act on the color triplet quark fields are given by:

$$D_\mu =\partial_\mu \pm ig_s t_a \mathcal{A}^a_\mu\,,$$

wherein i is the imaginary unit, and

$$g_s = \sqrt{4\pi \alpha_s}$$

is the dimensionless coupling constant for QCD, and $\alpha_s$ is the strong coupling constant. Different authors choose different signs. The partial derivative term includes a 3 × 3 identity matrix, conventionally not written for simplicity.

The quark fields in triplet representation are written as column vectors:

$$\psi=\begin{pmatrix}\psi_{1}\\
\psi_{2}\\
\psi_{3}
\end{pmatrix},\overline{\psi}=\begin{pmatrix}\overline{\psi}^*_{1}\\
\overline{\psi}^*_{2}\\
\overline{\psi}^*_{3}
\end{pmatrix}$$

The quark field ψ belongs to the fundamental representation (3) and the antiquark field ψ̅ belongs to the complex conjugate representation (3^{*}), complex conjugate is denoted by * (not overbar).

== Gauge transformations ==
The gauge transformation of each gluon field $\mathcal{A}^n_\alpha$ which leaves the gluon field strength tensor unchanged is;

$$\mathcal{A}^n_\alpha\rightarrow e^{i\bar{\theta}(\mathbf{r},t)} \left(\mathcal{A}^n_\alpha + \frac{i}{g_s}\partial_\alpha\right)e^{-i\bar{\theta}(\mathbf{r},t)}$$

where

$$\bar{\theta}(\mathbf{r},t) = t_n \theta^n(\mathbf{r},t)\,,$$

is a 3 × 3 matrix constructed from the t^{n} matrices above and θ^{n} = θ^{n}(r, t) are eight gauge functions dependent on spatial position r and time t. Matrix exponentiation is used in the transformation. The gauge covariant derivative transforms similarly. The functions θ^{n} here are similar to the gauge function χ(r, t) when changing the electromagnetic four-potential A, in spacetime components:

$$A'_\alpha (\mathbf{r},t) = A_\alpha (\mathbf{r},t) - \partial_\alpha \chi (\mathbf{r},t) \,$$

leaving the electromagnetic tensor F invariant.

The quark fields are invariant under the gauge transformation;

$$\psi(\mathbf{r},t) \rightarrow e^{ig\bar{\theta}(\mathbf{r},t)}\psi(\mathbf{r},t)$$

== See also ==
- Quark confinement
- Gell-Mann matrices
- Field (physics)
- Einstein tensor
- Symmetry in quantum mechanics
- Wilson loop
- Wess–Zumino gauge
