= Moo-Young Han =

Korean-American physicist

- Born: November 30, 1934; Seoul, Korea
- Died: May 15, 2016 (aged 81); Durham, North Carolina, United States
- Education: Carroll College; University of Rochester
- Employer: Duke University
- Known for: Introducing the SU(3) symmetry of quarks

Korean name
- Hangul: 한무영
- Hanja: 韓武榮
- RR: Han Muyeong
- MR: Han Muyŏng

Moo-Young Han (November 30, 1934 – May 15, 2016) was a South Korean-born American physicist. He was a professor of physics at Duke University. Along with Yoichiro Nambu of the University of Chicago, he is credited with introducing the SU(3) symmetry of quarks, today known as the color charge. The color charge is the basis of the strong force as explained by quantum chromodynamics.

== Early life and career ==
Han was born in Seoul, Korea. He emigrated to the US after the Korean War to attend Carroll College. He received his Ph.D. from the University of Rochester in 1964 and joined the physics faculty at Duke University, Durham NC in 1967. He is survived by his wife, Chang Ki, three children, Grace Hewon, Christopher Su-Young, and Anthony Suh-Young, and an array of grandchildren.

== Career ==
Han received his Ph.D. in theoretical physics in 1964 from the University of Rochester. Han's research specialty is in the field of theoretical particle physics, with an emphasis on the symmetry principles of elementary particle physics. Han and Yoichiro Nambu of the University of Chicago first introduced a new hidden symmetry among quarks in 1965. This is the origin of the color SU(3) symmetry, distinct from the symmetry among hadrons which is the flavor SU(3). This SU(3) symmetry is the basis for the quantum chromodynamics (QCD) which is now the standard theory for the strong nuclear force sector of the Standard Model. Nambu shared 2008 Nobel Prize in Physics for a related work on applying the mechanism of spontaneously broken symmetry, enabling the electroweak sector of the Standard Model.

From 1993 to 1995, Han served as the inaugurating chair of the Outstanding Young Researcher Award (OYRA) Committee of AKPA. He is a recipient of the 1998 Global Korea Award by the Council on Korean Studies of the Michigan State University. He delivered the keynote address at the 2001 Asian Pacific Heritage Month Celebration at the US-Environmental Protection Agency in Research Triangle Park, North Carolina in May, 2001. The title of his keynote address was "The New New World." Han is the founding chairman of the Society of Korean-American Scholars (SKAS) and since then, he has served as its editor-in-chief n SKAS. He publishes two alternating weekly electronic newsletters, KASTN and IEKAS, the Korean American Science and Technology News and the Information Exchange for Korean American Scholars.

In the fall of 2008, Han left the University of California, Merced and delivered a special seminar explaining the spontaneously broken symmetry of Y. Nambu that earned Nambu the 2008 Nobel Prize in Physics. Leaving the Seoul National University in Korea in the fall of 2009, Han delivered a colloquium titled "Nambu and the Standard Model" and taught a special course titled "Physics for Humanities and Social Sciences Course." In the fall of 2013, Han spent his time at KAIST (Korea Advanced Institute of Science and Technology) in Daejeon, South Korea and completed his fifth and sixth books. He also served as an adjunct professor of physics at KAIST.

== Publications ==
Han is the author of 5 books and editor of a collection of papers on quantum physics and advanced technology:

- The Secret Life Of Quanta (1990, McGraw-Hill)
- The Probable Universe (1993, McGraw-Hill)
- Quarks And Gluons (1999, World Scientific)
- A Story Of Light: A Short Introduction to Quantum Field Theory of Quarks and Leptons (2004, World Scientific).
- From Photons to Higgs: A Story of Light (2014, World Scientific).
- Nambu: A Foreteller of Modern Physics (2014, World Scientific Series in 20th Century Physics, Vol.43).
