= Radiative process =

Concept in particle physics

In this Feynman diagram, electrons annihilate and become a quark-antiquark pair. Then one radiates a gluon. (Time goes left to right.)

In particle physics, a radiative process refers to one elementary particle emitting another and continuing to exist. This typically happens when a fermion emits a boson such as a gluon or photon.

== See also ==
- Bremsstrahlung
