= Hadronization =

Process by which hadrons are formed

Hadronization (or hadronisation) is the process of the formation of hadrons out of quarks and gluons. There are two main branches of hadronization: quark-gluon plasma (QGP) transformation and colour string decay into hadrons. The transformation of quark-gluon plasma into hadrons is studied in lattice QCD numerical simulations, which are explored in relativistic heavy-ion experiments. Quark-gluon plasma hadronization occurred shortly after the Big Bang when the quark–gluon plasma cooled down to the Hagedorn temperature (about 150 MeV) when free quarks and gluons cannot exist. In string breaking, new hadrons are forming out of quarks, antiquarks and sometimes gluons, spontaneously created from the vacuum.

== Statistical hadronization ==
A highly successful description of QGP hadronization is based on statistical phase space weighting according to the Fermi–Pomeranchuk model of particle production. This approach was developed, since 1950, initially as a qualitative description of strongly interacting particle production. It was originally not meant to be an accurate description, but a phase space estimate of upper limit to particle yield. In the following years numerous hadronic resonances were discovered. Rolf Hagedorn postulated the statistical bootstrap model (SBM) allowing to describe hadronic interactions in terms of statistical resonance weights and the resonance mass spectrum. This turned the qualitative Fermi–Pomeranchuk model into a precise statistical hadronization model for particle production. However, this property of hadronic interactions poses a challenge for the statistical hadronization model as the yield of particles is sensitive to the unidentified high mass hadron resonance states. The statistical hadronization model was first applied to relativistic heavy-ion collisions in 1991, which led to the recognition of the first strange anti-baryon signature of quark-gluon plasma discovered at CERN.

== Phenomenological studies of string model and fragmentation ==
The QCD (Quantum Chromodynamics) of the hadronization process are not yet fully understood, but are modeled and parameterized in a number of phenomenological studies, including the Lund string model and in various long-range QCD approximation schemes.

The tight cone of particles created by the hadronization of a single quark is called a jet. In particle detectors, jets are observed rather than quarks, whose existence must be inferred. The models and approximation schemes and their predicted jet hadronization, or fragmentation, have been extensively compared with measurement in a number of high energy particle physics experiments, e.g. TASSO, OPAL and H1.

Hadronization can be explored using Monte Carlo simulation. After the particle shower has terminated, partons with virtualities (how far off shell the virtual particles are) on the order of the cut-off scale remain. From this point on, the parton is in the low momentum transfer, long-distance regime in which non-perturbative effects become important. The most dominant of these effects is hadronization, which converts partons into observable hadrons. No exact theory for hadronization is known but there are two successful models for parameterization.

These models are used within event generators which simulate particle physics events. The scale at which partons are given to the hadronization is fixed by the shower Monte Carlo component of the event generator. Hadronization models typically start at some predefined scale of their own. This can cause significant issue if not set up properly within the Shower Monte Carlo. Common choices of shower Monte Carlo are PYTHIA and HERWIG. Each of these correspond to one of the two parameterization models.

== The top quark does not hadronize ==
The top quark, however, decays via the weak force with a mean lifetime of 5×10^{−25} seconds. Unlike all other weak interactions, which typically are much slower than strong interactions, the top quark weak decay is uniquely shorter than the time scale at which the strong force of QCD acts, so a top quark decays before it can hadronize. The top quark is therefore almost a free particle.
