= TASSO =

Particle Detector

TASSO (Two Arm Spectrometer SOlenoid) was a particle detector at the PETRA particle accelerator at the German national laboratory DESY. The TASSO collaboration is best known for having discovered the gluon, the mediator of the strong interaction and carrier of the color charge. Four TASSO scientists, Paul Söding, Bjørn Wiik, Günter Wolf and Sau Lan Wu, were awarded the High Energy and Particle Physics Prize from the European Physical Society (EPS) in 1995. A special prize was also awarded to the TASSO collaboration, as well as the JADE, MARK J and PLUTO collaborations, in recognition of their combined work on the gluon as the "definite existence (of the gluon) emerged gradually from the results of the TASSO collaboration and the other experiments working at PETRA, JADE, MARK J and PLUTO". TASSO took data from 1978 to 1986 and discovered the gluon in 1979.

== See also ==
- Particle physics
