= Oscar W. Greenberg =

American physicist

Oscar Wallace Greenberg (born February 18, 1932) is an American physicist and professor at University of Maryland College of Computer, Mathematical, and Natural Sciences. In 1964, he posited the existence of quarks that obeyed parastatistics as the fundamental constituents of hadronic particles.

== Educational background ==
He received his bachelor's degree from Rutgers University in 1952. He received his master's degree in 1954 and his doctorate degree in 1957, both from Princeton University.

== Professional History ==
- 1956 Instructor at Brandeis University.
- 1957 Air Force Cambridge Research Center, 1st Lieutenant, USAF.
- 1959 NSF postdoctoral fellow at MIT.
- 1961 Assistant professor, University of Maryland.
- 1963 Associate professor, University of Maryland.
- Fall, 1964, Member, Institute for Advanced Study.
- 1964 Proposed the existence of color charge.
- 1965-66 Visiting Associate professor, Rockefeller University.
- 1967- Professor, University of Maryland.
- 1968 Guggenheim Fellowship
- 1968-69 Visiting Professor, Weizmann Institute of Science and Tel-Aviv University.
- 2013- Member of Adjunct Faculty, Rockefeller University.
