= Gell-Mann matrices =

Basis for the SU(3) Lie algebra

The Gell-Mann matrices, developed by Murray Gell-Mann, are a set of eight linearly independent 3×3 traceless Hermitian matrices used in the study of the strong interaction in particle physics. They span the Lie algebra of the SU(3) group in the defining representation, up to a prefactor of $i$.

== Matrices ==
$$\lambda_1 = \begin{pmatrix} 0 & 1 & 0 \\ 1 & 0 & 0 \\ 0 & 0 & 0 \end{pmatrix}$$	$$\lambda_2 = \begin{pmatrix} 0 & -i & 0 \\ i & 0 & 0 \\ 0 & 0 & 0 \end{pmatrix}$$	$$\lambda_3 = \begin{pmatrix} 1 & 0 & 0 \\ 0 & -1 & 0 \\ 0 & 0 & 0 \end{pmatrix}$$
$$\lambda_4 = \begin{pmatrix} 0 & 0 & 1 \\ 0 & 0 & 0 \\ 1 & 0 & 0 \end{pmatrix}$$	$$\lambda_5 = \begin{pmatrix} 0 & 0 & -i \\ 0 & 0 & 0 \\ i & 0 & 0 \end{pmatrix}$$
$$\lambda_6 = \begin{pmatrix} 0 & 0 & 0 \\ 0 & 0 & 1 \\ 0 & 1 & 0 \end{pmatrix}$$	$$\lambda_7 = \begin{pmatrix} 0 & 0 & 0 \\ 0 & 0 & -i \\ 0 & i & 0 \end{pmatrix}$$	$$\lambda_8 = \frac{1}{\sqrt{3}} \begin{pmatrix} 1 & 0 & 0 \\ 0 & 1 & 0 \\ 0 & 0 & -2 \end{pmatrix}  .$$

== Properties ==
These matrices are traceless, Hermitian, and obey the extra trace orthonormality relation, so they can generate unitary matrix group elements of SU(3) through exponentiation. These properties were chosen by Gell-Mann because they then naturally generalize the Pauli matrices for SU(2) to SU(3), which formed the basis for Gell-Mann's quark model. Gell-Mann's generalization further extends to general SU(n). For their connection to the standard basis of Lie algebras, see the Weyl–Cartan basis.

=== Trace orthonormality ===
In mathematics, orthonormality typically implies a norm which has a value of unity (1). Gell-Mann matrices, however, are normalized to a value of 2. Thus, the trace of the pairwise product results in the ortho-normalization condition

$$\operatorname{tr}(\lambda_i \lambda_j) = 2\delta_{ij},$$

where $\delta_{ij}$ is the Kronecker delta.

This is so the embedded Pauli matrices corresponding to the three embedded subalgebras of SU(2) are conventionally normalized. In this three-dimensional matrix representation, the Cartan subalgebra is the set of linear combinations (with real coefficients) of the two matrices $\lambda_3$ and $\lambda_8$, which commute with each other.

There are three significant SU(2) subalgebras:

- $\{\lambda_1, \lambda_2, \lambda_3\}$
- $\{\lambda_4, \lambda_5, x\},$ and
- $\{\lambda_6, \lambda_7, y\},$

where the x and y are linear combinations of $\lambda_3$ and $\lambda_8$. The SU(2) Casimirs of these subalgebras mutually commute.

However, any unitary similarity transformation of these subalgebras will yield SU(2) subalgebras. There is an uncountable number of such transformations.

=== Commutation relations ===
The 8 generators of SU(3) satisfy the commutation and anti-commutation relations

$$\begin{align}
\left[ \lambda_a, \lambda_b \right] &= 2 i \sum_c f_{abc} \lambda_c, \\
\{ \lambda_a, \lambda_b \} &= \frac{4}{3} \delta_{ab} I + 2 \sum_c d_{abc} \lambda_c,
\end{align}$$

with the structure constants

$$\begin{align}
f_{abc} &= -\frac{1}{4} i \operatorname{tr}([\lambda_a , \lambda_b] \lambda_c ), \\
d_{abc} &= \frac{1}{4} \operatorname{tr}(\{\lambda_a , \lambda_b\} \lambda_c ).
\end{align}$$

The structure constants $d_{abc}$ are completely symmetric in the three indices. The structure constants $f_{abc}$ are completely antisymmetric in the three indices, generalizing the antisymmetry of the Levi-Civita symbol $\epsilon_{jkl}$ of SU(2). For the present order of Gell-Mann matrices they take the values

$$f_{123} = 1 \ , \quad f_{147} = f_{165} = f_{246} = f_{257} = f_{345} = f_{376} = \frac{1}{2} \ , \quad f_{458} = f_{678} = \frac{\sqrt{3}}{2} \ .$$

In general, they evaluate to zero, unless they contain an odd count of indices from the set {2,5,7}, corresponding to the antisymmetric (imaginary) λs.

Using these commutation relations, the product of Gell-Mann matrices can be written as

$$\lambda_a \lambda_b
= \frac{1}{2} ([\lambda_a,\lambda_b] + \{\lambda_a,\lambda_b\})
= \frac{2}{3} \delta_{ab} I + \sum_c \left(d_{abc} + i f_{abc}\right) \lambda_c ,$$

where I is the 3×3 identity matrix.

=== Fierz completeness relations ===
Since the eight matrices and the identity are a complete trace-orthogonal set spanning all 3×3 matrices, it is straightforward to find two Fierz completeness relations, (Li & Cheng, 4.134), analogous to that satisfied by the Pauli matrices. Namely, using the dot to sum over the eight matrices and using Greek indices for their row/column indices, the following identities hold,

$$\delta^\alpha _\beta  \delta^\gamma  _\delta   = \frac{1}{3} \delta^\alpha_\delta  \delta^\gamma _\beta  +\frac{1}{2} \lambda^\alpha _\delta \cdot \lambda^\gamma _\beta$$

and

$$\lambda^\alpha _\beta \cdot  \lambda^\gamma  _\delta   = 2 \delta^\alpha_\delta  \delta^\gamma _\beta  -\frac{2}{3}  \delta^\alpha_\beta  \delta^\gamma _\delta    ~.$$

== Representation theory ==
A particular choice of matrices is called a group representation, because any element of SU(3) can be written in the form $\mathrm{exp}(i \theta^j g_j)$ using the Einstein notation, where the eight $\theta^j$ are real numbers and a sum over the index j is implied. Given one representation, an equivalent one may be obtained by an arbitrary unitary similarity transformation, since that leaves the commutator unchanged.

The matrices can be realized as a representation of the infinitesimal generators of the special unitary group called SU(3). The Lie algebra of this group (a real Lie algebra in fact) has dimension eight and therefore it has some set with eight linearly independent generators, which can be written as $g_i$, with i taking values from 1 to 8.

=== Casimir operators and invariants ===
The squared sum of the Gell-Mann matrices gives the quadratic Casimir operator, a group invariant,

$$C = \sum_{i=1}^8 \lambda_i \lambda_i = \frac{16} 3 I$$

where $I\,$is 3×3 identity matrix. There is another, independent, cubic Casimir operator, as well.

== Application to quantum chromodynamics ==
These matrices serve to study the internal (color) rotations of the gluon fields associated with the coloured quarks of quantum chromodynamics (cf. colours of the gluon). A gauge colour rotation is a spacetime-dependent SU(3) group element $\; U = \exp \left(\frac{\ i\ }{2}\ \theta^k({\mathbf r},t)\ \lambda_k\right) \;,$ where summation over the eight indices k is implied.

== See also ==
- Casimir element
- Clebsch–Gordan coefficients for SU(3)
- Generalizations of Pauli matrices
- Group representations
- Killing form
- Pauli matrices
- Qutrit
- SU(3)
