= Positron–Electron Tandem Ring Accelerator =

PETRA III
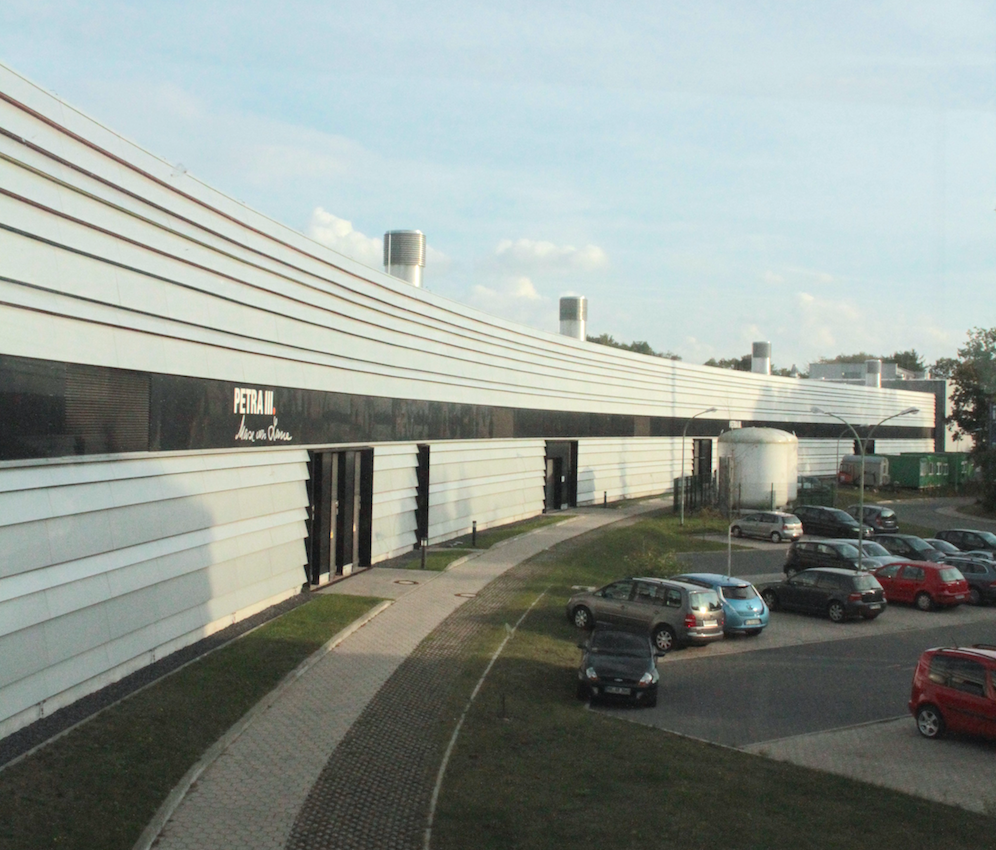
- PETRA III Max von Laue hall at the DESY campus in Hamburg.

General properties
- Accelerator type: Synchrotron light source
- Beam type: electrons
- Target type: Light source

Beam properties
- Maximum energy: 6 GeV
- Maximum brightness: 10^{21} ph./(s mm^{2} mrad^{2} 0.1% BW)

Physical properties
- Circumference: 2.304 kilometres (1.432 mi)
- Location: Hamburg, Germany
- Coordinates: 53.579049°N 9.88370°E
- Institution: DESY
- Dates of operation: 2009–present
- Preceded by: PETRA II

The Positron–Electron Tandem Ring Accelerator (PETRA) is one of the particle accelerators at the German national laboratory DESY in Hamburg, Germany. At the time of its construction, it was the biggest storage ring of its kind and still is DESY's second largest synchrotron after HERA. PETRA's original purpose was research in elementary particle physics. From 1978 to 1986, it was used to study electron–positron collisions with the four experiments JADE, MARK-J, PLUTO and TASSO. The discovery of the gluon, the carrier particle of the strong nuclear force, by the TASSO collaboration in 1979 is counted as one of the biggest successes. PETRA was able to accelerate electrons and positrons to 19 GeV.

Research at PETRA led to an intensified international use of the facilities at DESY. Scientists from China, France, Israel, the Netherlands, Norway, the United Kingdom and the USA participated in the first experiments at PETRA alongside many German colleagues.

== PETRA II ==
In 1990, the facility was taken into operation again under the name PETRA II as a pre-accelerator for protons and electrons/positrons for the new particle accelerator HERA. In March 1995, PETRA II was equipped with undulators to create greater amounts of synchrotron radiation with higher energies, especially in the X-ray part of the spectrum. PETRA II served the Hamburg Synchrotron Radiation Laboratory (HASYLAB) at DESY as a source of high-energy synchrotron radiation in three test experimental areas. In PETRA II, positrons were accelerated to up to 12 GeV.

== PETRA III ==
PETRA III is the third incarnation for the PETRA storage ring, serving a regular user programme as one of the most brilliant storage-ring-based X-ray sources worldwide since 2009. The accelerator produces a particle energy of 6 GeV. There are currently three experimental halls (named after various famous scientists). The largest, named Max von Laue Hall, has a concrete floor over 300 m long that was poured as a single piece in order to limit vibrations. PETRA III delivers hard X-ray beams of very high brilliance to over 40 experimental stations.

== See also ==
- Materials oscilloscope
