= Synchro-Cyclotron (CERN) =

Particle and Nuclear Physics

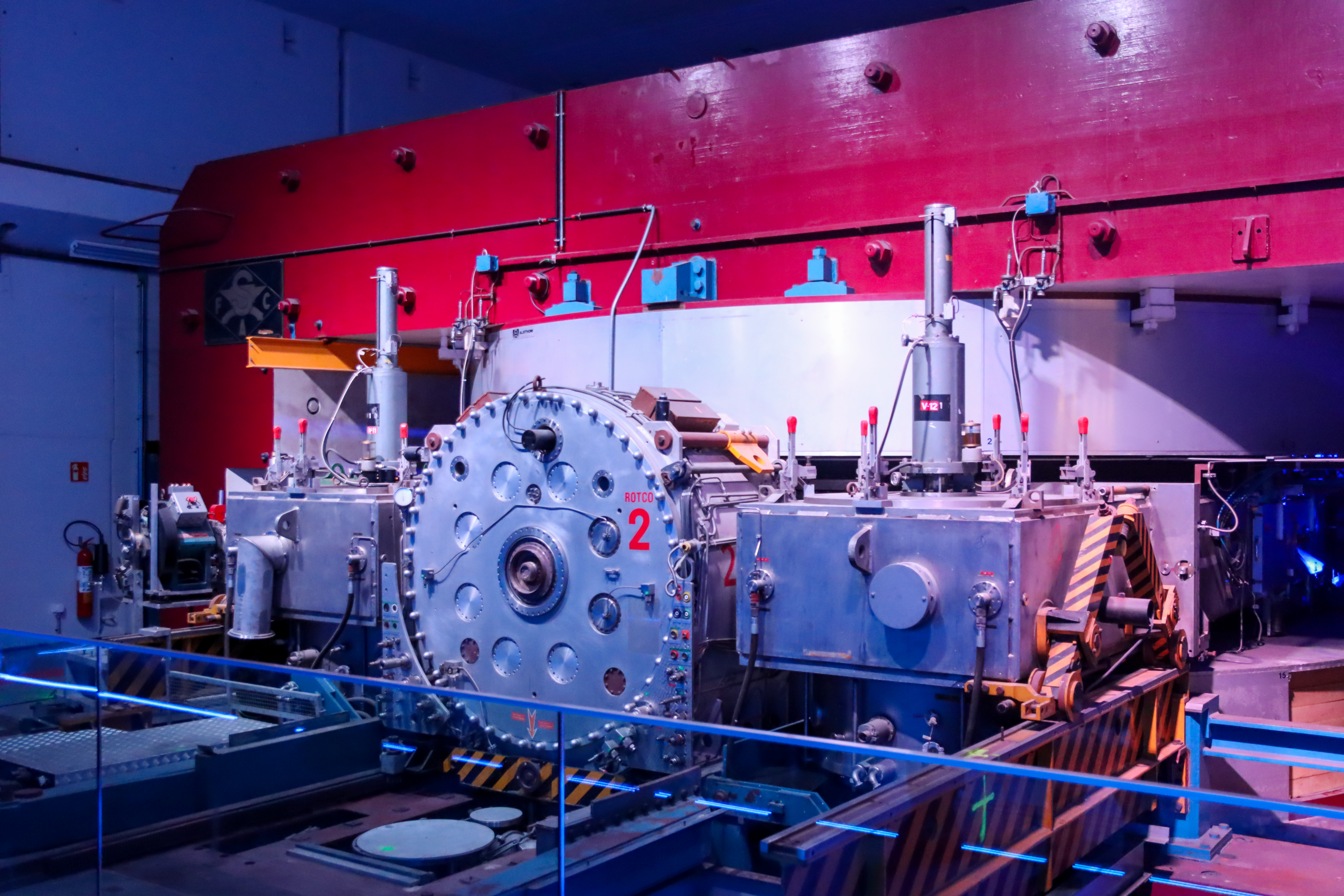
- The CERN Synchrocyclotron in 2024

General properties
- Accelerator type: Synchrocyclotron
- Beam type: proton
- Target type: Fixed Target

Beam properties
- Maximum energy: 600 MeV
- Maximum current: 10 μA

Physical properties
- Radius: 2.25 m
- Location: Geneva, Switzerland
- Coordinates: 46°13′58.7136″N 6°03′9.9468″E
- Institution: CERN
- Dates of operation: 1957 - 1990
- Succeeded by: Proton Synchrotron Booster

The Synchro-Cyclotron, or Synchrocyclotron (SC), built in 1957, was CERN’s first accelerator. It was 15.7 meters in circumference and provided for CERN's first experiments in particle and nuclear physics. It accelerated particles to energies up to 600 MeV. The foundation stone of CERN was laid at the site of the Synchrocyclotron by the first Director-General of CERN, Felix Bloch. After its remarkably long 33 years of service time, the SC was decommissioned in 1990. Nowadays it accepts visitors as an exhibition area in CERN.

== Background ==
The Synchrocyclotron (as a general idea) was invented by Edwin McMillan in 1945 as an adaptation of the cyclotron to correct for relativistic effects as particles approach a significant fraction of the speed of light. Its main purpose is to accelerate charged particles such as protons and deutrons.

The machine consists of two D-shaped hollow metal electrodes (called "dee"s) with a gap between them, connected to a radio frequency (RF) alternating voltage source. These dees are placed on a plane in a way that their openings on the flat sides face each other. The particles inside the syncrocylotron can be accelerated from one dee to the other by the force produced by the electrical field between dees.

The particles accelerated between dees with this method are confined to a curved path by the magnetic field created by two large magnets placed below and above the structure. The machine continues to accelerate particles by alternating the direction of the electrical field until they reach the desired radius. They are then extracted and directed to their destination. Throughout the process, the frequency of the accelerating voltage is being decreased to compensate for the relativistic mass increase of the particles as they approach the speed of light.

== History ==
In late 1951, a UNESCO meeting about a new European organization for nuclear research was held in Paris. In the meeting, the synchrocyclotron machine was proposed as an ideal solution for a medium-energy accelerator to use until they built a more powerful accelerator. Later in May 1952, in the first council meeting of the proposed organization, Cornelis Bakker was appointed as director of the Synchro-Cyclotron Study Group. After a month, in a report called Provisional Program of Synchro-Cyclotron Study Group, the group decided that they would need a design that could provide 600 MeV protons. The initial objective of the group stated as indicating the scope of the work to be done and studying and/or designing the necessary items. After preliminary studies, the first meeting of the SC study group was held in Copenhagen in mid-June. Decisions made in the meeting included several trips to see similar machines around the world, making contacts to find appropriate companies that can build necessary pieces and preparing basic drawings of the machine. After a second meeting at Amsterdam in August, a progress report dated 1 October 1952 was prepared to be presented in the meeting of the European Council for Nuclear Research which was going to be held in Amsterdam in October. According to the report, the group aimed to finish its work in a year and a complete report to be presented to the European Council for Nuclear Research. A preliminary design drawing of the SC was attached to the report which stated that the work of the group was progressing "satisfactorily" and they were cooperating "adequately".

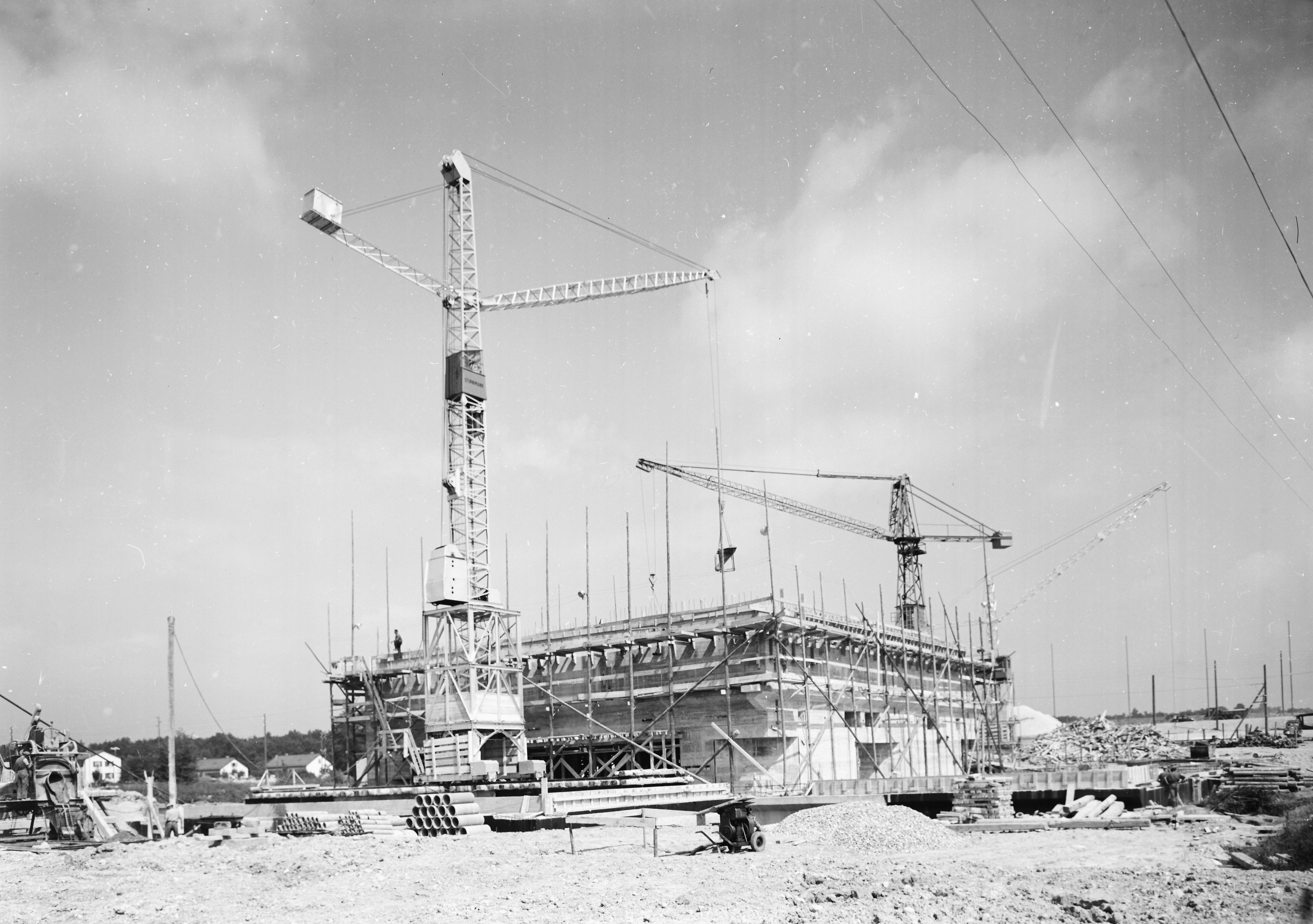
The Synchro-Cyclotron (CERN) construction site

In 1953, after a year of research, meetings and reports alike, the design of the Synchro-Cyclotron started. The construction of the machine began in 1954 on the site at Meyrin with the parts coming from all over Western Europe. In late 1955, Wolfgang Gentner became the director of the Synchro-Cyclotron Study Group, as former director Cornelis Bakker became the Director-General of CERN. The research program for the Synchrocyclotron started to be planned to be able to start experiments as soon as possible. The SC was ready to produce its first beam in August 1957, practically on the date foreseen. A press release by CERN on 16 August 1957, stated that the SC, as the third-largest accelerator of its type in the world, had started to work at its full energy. In late 1958, the Synchrocyclotron made its first important contribution to nuclear physics by the discovery of the rare electron decay of the pion particle. This discovery helped theorists a lot by proving that this decay really occurs. The Synchrocyclotron was used for an average of 135 hours per week during 1961; it ran continuously every day of the week except Mondays which were reserved for maintenance. The Synchrocyclotron was accelerating a jet of protons 54 times a second, up to a speed of approximately 240,000 kilometers per second (80% percent of the speed of light).

In May 1960, plans for an isotope separator were published in Vienna. This isotope separator was built by CERN's Nuclear Chemistry Group (NCG) and used in measurements of production rates of radionuclides produced in the Synchrocyclotron. High production rates observed during these measurements proved that the SC was the ideal machine for experiments for on-line production of rare isotopes. In April 1963, a group of physicists met at CERN to discuss for the isotope separator project. In late 1964, a formal proposal was submitted for the project and accepted by the CERN Director-General. In the same year, the Synchrocyclotron started to concentrate on nuclear physics alone, leaving particle physics to a more powerful accelerator built in 1959, the Proton Synchrotron. In May 1966, the Synchrocyclotron was shut down for major modifications. Until mid-July, the capacity of the SC and its associated facilities were improved. Also, a new tunnel was constructed for an external proton beamline to the new underground hall for the new isotope separator. In 1967, it started supplying beams for the dedicated radioactive-ion-beam facility called ISOLDE, which still carries out research ranging from pure nuclear physics to astrophysics and medical physics.

In 1969, preparations started to increase the beam intensity and improve the beam extraction efficiency of the SC. It was shut down in June 1973 for modifications. The highly improved machine started working again for physical research with its new name, SC2, in January 1975. In 1990, ISOLDE was transferred to the Proton Synchrotron Booster, and the SC finally closed down after 33 years of service.

== Converted to a CERN visitor point ==
Having served as storage facility since the 1990 shutdown, the SC and its building, the SC hall, were renovated in 2012-2013 to become an exhibition area for visitors, opening September 2013. The exhibition includes a multi-media show about the birth of CERN and the Synchrocyclotron. Using projection mapping technology, it displays simulations of the accelerating particles on the SC and demonstrates parts of it. SC physicicts—and CERN pioneers—Giuseppe and Maria Fidecaro are featured in the show. Some objects and tools which were used at the time the Synchrocyclotron was started are also in the hall for visitors to see.

== Activities ==
Below is the list of some physics activities done at the SC.

- Observation of the electron decay of the pion
- Measurement of the muon anomalous magnetic moment
- Observation of the beta decay of the pion
- Measurement of positron helicity from muon decay
- Muon capture in hydrogen
- Muon channel
- Muonic and pionic x-rays
- Pion scattering
- Nucleon scattering
- Muon spin resonance for solid-state work: Metals, semiconductors, polymers
- Radioisotopes for medicine
- Nuclear spectroscopy
- Far unstable nuclei and rare decay modes
- Strength functions and statistical aspects of beta decay
- Atomic physics: x-rays, optical spectra of francium
- Implantation for solid-state physics applications
- Investigation of nuclear structure: distribution of nuclear charges and magnetic moments
- Electromagnetic interaction between the muon and the nucleus
- Pionic atoms: strong interaction effect
- Pion double charge exchange
- Pion production and absorption
- Spallation, fission, fragmentation reactions with the production of radioactive species
- Studies on nuclear masses, nuclear shapes, exotic decays
- Radioactive detection of optical pump: discovery of shape staggering and shape coexistence in the Hg region
- Rabi apparatus for the measurement of spin and magnetic moment
- Laser-induced optical pumping
- Collinear laser spectroscopy
- Resonance ionization mass spectroscopy
