= Cornelis Bakker =

Dutch physicist (1904–1960)

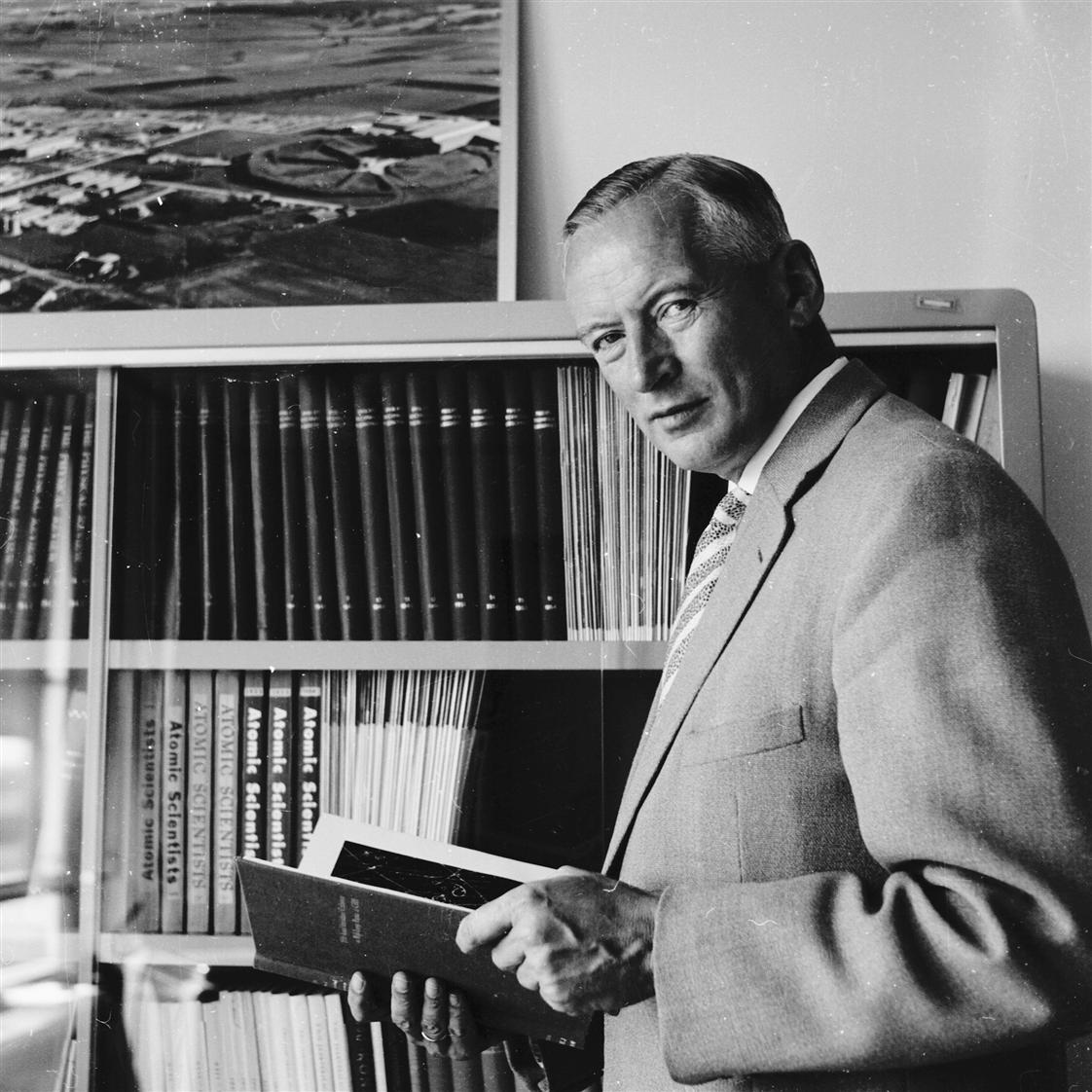
- Bakker in 1959

2nd Director-General of CERN
- In office 1955–1960
- Preceded by: Felix Bloch
- Succeeded by: Victor Weisskopf

Personal details
- Born: Cornelis Jan Bakker; 11 March 1904 Amsterdam, Netherlands
- Died: 23 April 1960 (aged 56) New York City, US
- Scientific career
- Education: University of Amsterdam (PhD)
- Known for: Development of the Synchro-Cyclotron
- Fields: Physics
- Workplaces: Philips; University of Amsterdam; CERN
- Doctoral advisor: Pieter Zeeman
- Doctoral students: Aaldert Wapstra

Cornelis Jan Bakker (Dutch: [kɔrˈneːlɪs jɑn ˈbɑkər]; 11 March 1904 – 23 April 1960) was a Dutch physicist who served as Director-General of CERN from 1955 until his death in 1960.

== Education ==
Cornelis Jan Bakker was born on 11 March 1904 in Amsterdam, Netherlands, where he studied physics at the University of Amsterdam under Pieter Zeeman. In 1931, he received his Ph.D. with a thesis on the effects of the Zeeman effect on spectral lines of noble gases. The following year, he went to the Imperial College of Science in London, where he continued his research in the area of spectroscopy.

== Career ==
In 1933, Bakker worked for the scientific department of Philips in Eindhoven, where he was active in the field of wireless technology. The following year, his interest in nuclear physics grew, and he started during World War II, in cooperation with August Heyn, the development of a cyclotron for Philips.

After the war, Bakker replaced Cornelis Jacobus Gorter as Professor of Physics and Director of the Zeeman Laboratory at the University of Amsterdam in 1946. In addition, he became Director of the Institute for Nuclear Physics at Amsterdam and Philips, which, sponsored by the Netherlands Organisation for Scientific Research, formed the center of nuclear physics research in the Netherlands.

In 1951, Bakker was invited by Professor Pierre Auger (then director of the scientific department of UNESCO) to join a group of eight experts which should make plans about the future CERN. He is considered one of the founders of CERN. In 1952, he became director of a group responsible for the design and construction of the Synchro-Cyclotron; then he was appointed Director of the Synchro-Cyclotron Department. The same year, he became a Member of the Royal Netherlands Academy of Arts and Sciences, and in 1955 became a Foreign Member.

In 1955, Bakker succeeded Felix Bloch as Director-General of CERN, a position he held until he died in a plane crash on 23 April 1960 in New York City. During his funeral, Bakker's work and commitment to CERN and science was repeatedly touted by politicians and researchers, such as John Adams or Jo Cals. In addition, he was awarded the Order of the Netherlands Lion by Queen Juliana and later a street on the CERN Meyrin site was named in his memory.

Business positions
Preceded by Felix Bloch	Director General of CERN; 1955–23/04/1960	Succeeded by John Adams
