= List of things named after Felix Bloch =

== Physics ==
Name	Description
Bloch's theorem	Fundamental theorem in condensed matter physics describing the wavefunction of a particle confined in a periodic medium
Bloch electron	An electron that behaves the Schrodinger equation with a periodic potential, as described by Bloch's theorem.
Bloch form	A planewave multiplied by a periodic function
Bloch state: Bloch function; Bloch potential; Bloch wave; Bloch wavefunction	Bloch states (also called Bloch functions, Bloch wavefunction, and Bloch wave) are the solutions to Schrodinger's equation in a periodic potential—given by the Bloch form—as described by Bloch's theorem.
Bethe–Bloch formula	Quantifies the energy loss per unit distance for fast-moving charged particles in a material
Bloch–Grüneisen law or Bloch T^{5} law	Formula for characteristic electronic energy scale in materials with a small Fermi surfaces
Bloch–Siegert shift	Quantum phenomenon resulting in the shift of the dipole resonant frequency in certain systems
Bloch equations	Set of equations used to calculate the nuclear magnetization as a function of time in nuclear magnetic resonance
Bloch oscillations: Super Bloch oscillations; Bloch oscillator; Bloch frequency	Driven oscillation of a particle in a periodic potential: Bloch oscillations with amplitude several orders of magnitude larger than traditional ones; A system containing a charged particle in a periodic lattice subject to an external driving force; The frequency of Bloch oscillations
Bloch spectrum	A type of energy spectrum
Bloch sphere	Geometric representation of the pure state space of a qubit
Bloch T^{3/2} law	The formula describing the fractional change of magnetization in the thermal excitation of magnons.
Bloch wall	The transitional region between adjacent magnetic domains—each with a magnetization pointing in a different direction—where the magnetization direction varies
Maxwell–Bloch equations: Optical Bloch equations	Equations describing the dynamics of a two-state quantum system interacting with an optical resonator
Semiconductor Bloch equations	Equations describing the optical response of semiconductors to lasers and other coherent light sources

== Other namesakes ==
- Route Bloch, at CERN (Meyrin site)
- Bloch Auditorium, Hewlett Teaching Center room 201, Stanford University
- Bloch Beamline at MAX IV Laboratory
- Bloch Fellowship in quantum science and engineering at Stanford University
- Felix Bloch Institute for Solid State Physics at Leipzig University
- Felix Bloch Early Investigator Award and Felix Bloch Lecture Leipzig
