= Harwell Synchrocyclotron =

Particle accelerator in Oxfordshire, England

Coordinates: 51.5799°N 1.3082°W

The Harwell Synchrocyclotron was a particle accelerator based at the Atomic Energy Research Establishment campus near Harwell, Oxfordshire. Construction of the accelerator began in 1946 and it was completed in 1949. The machine was of the synchrocyclotron design, with a 1.62T magnet of diameter 110" (2.8m) allowing protons to be accelerated to energies of 160-175MeV. Accelerator physicist John Adams, who later went on to lead design of CERN's SPS, was instrumental in the design and construction of this machine. Its main function was basic nuclear and particle physics research, with a focus on proton-proton and proton-neutron scattering.

Comparisons were frequently drawn between the second cyclotron at the Harvard Cyclotron Laboratory and the Harwell Synchrocyclotron, and in 1974 clinicians from Oxford's Radcliffe Infirmary led by T. Hockaday floated plans to replicate the proton therapy work carried out at Massachusetts General Hospital with the accelerator. Initial preclinical research took place, including the measurement of proton beams in tissue equivalent plastics as part of the development of phantom materials by researchers at St Bartholomew's Hospital. Interest in this project continued into 1978, when the MRC met to make a funding decision. No clinical trials ever took place and decommissioning of the former AERE site began in the 1990s. Demolition of Hangar 7, which housed both the synchrocyclotron and the ZETA nuclear fusion project, was completed during financial year 2005/2006.
