= Léon Van Hove =

Belgian physicist

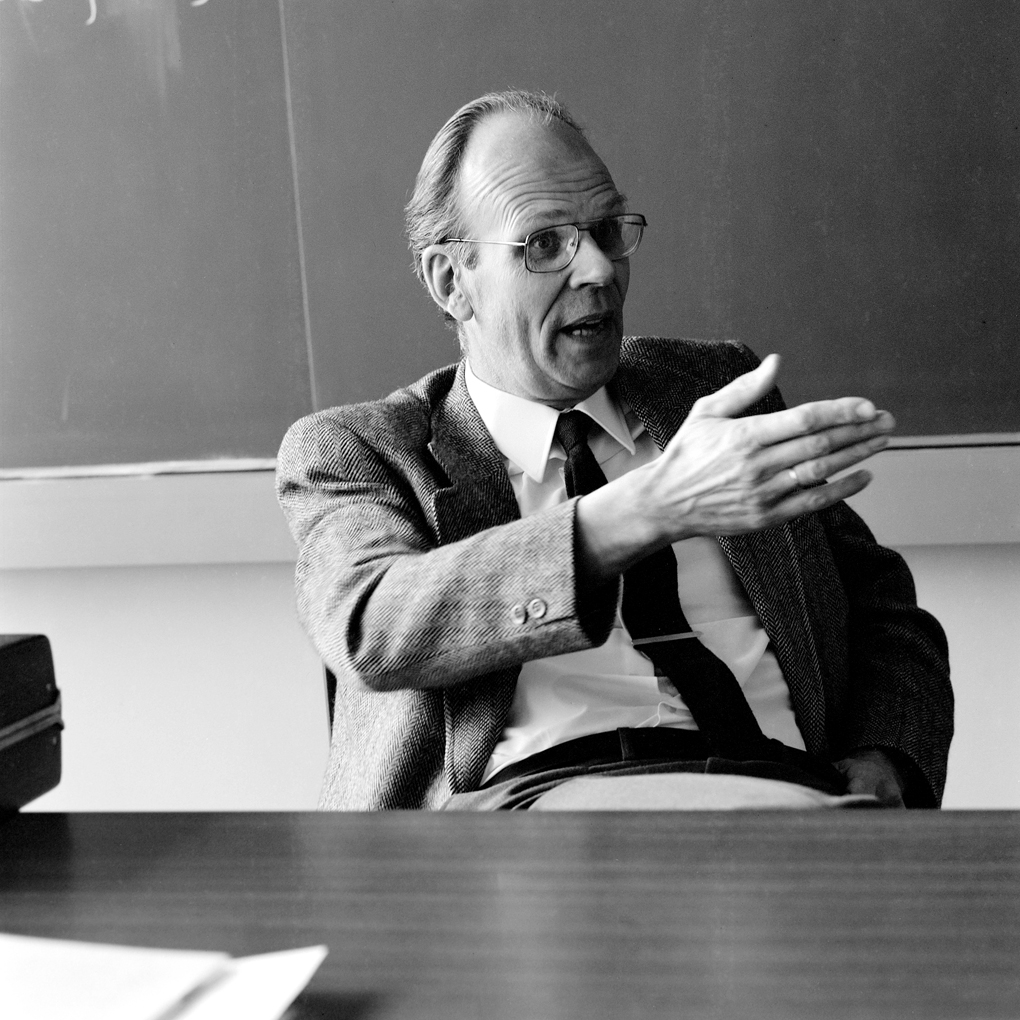
- Van Hove in 1976
- Born: Léon Charles Prudent Van Hove; 10 February 1924; Brussels, Belgium
- Died: 2 September 1990 (aged 66); Geneva, Switzerland
- Known for: Groenewold–van Hove theorem Van Hove function Van Hove singularity
- Awards: Max Planck Medal (1974); Heineman Prize (1962); Francqui Prize (1958)
- Scientific career
- Fields: Theoretical physics
- Doctoral students: Ted Janssen, Martinus Veltman

Léon Charles Prudent Van Hove (10 February 1924 – 2 September 1990) was a Belgian physicist and a Director General of CERN. He developed a scientific career spanning mathematics, solid state physics, elementary particle and nuclear physics to cosmology.

== Biography ==
Van Hove studied mathematics and physics at the Université libre de Bruxelles (ULB). In 1946 he received his PhD in mathematics at the ULB. From 1949 to 1954 he worked at the Institute for Advanced Study in Princeton, New Jersey by virtue of his meeting with Robert Oppenheimer. Later he worked at the Brookhaven National Laboratory and was a professor and Director of the Theoretical Physics Institute at the University of Utrecht in the Netherlands. In the 1950s he laid the theoretical foundations for the analysis of inelastic neutron scattering in terms of the dynamic structure factor. In 1958, he was awarded the Francqui Prize in Exact Sciences. In 1959, he received an invitation to become the head of the Theory Division at CERN in Geneva. In 1975 Prof. Van Hove was appointed CERN Director-General, with John Adams, responsible for the research activities of the Organization. The LEP project was proposed during Van Hove's tenure as Director General.

== Controversies ==
In 1963–64, George Zweig developed a particle physics model in which hadrons comprise fundamental constituents called "aces," independently of Murray Gell-Mann's quark model. As head of CERN's Theory Division, Van Hove opposed the work, reportedly refusing permission for journal submission, instructing staff not to type the manuscript, and cancelling a seminar where Zweig planned to present it. Zweig instead circulated the work as CERN preprints, which became influential despite not being formally published. Van Hove's actions substantially reduced the visibility of Zweig's work at a critical moment and are widely regarded as having contributed to Zweig's failure to receive the recognition that ultimately culminated in Gell-Mann alone receiving the 1969 Nobel Prize. Van Hove cited publication policy, though scientific skepticism toward fractionally charged constituents likely also played a role. Today, both Zweig and Gell-Mann are recognized as independent originators of the quark model.

== Awards ==
- Francqui Prize, 1958
- Dannie Heineman Prize for Mathematical Physics, 1962
- Member, American Academy of Arts and Sciences, 1964
- Max Planck Medal, 1974
- Member, United States National Academy of Sciences, 1980
- Member, American Philosophical Society, 1980

There is a square, Square Van Hove, named after Van Hove at CERN, Geneva, Switzerland.

== See also ==
- Quark–gluon plasma
- Quasielastic scattering
- Quasielastic neutron scattering
- List of Directors General of CERN
- Théophile de Donder
- Hilbrand J. Groenewold for the Groenewold–Van Hove theorem

Preceded by Willibald Jentschke and John Adams	CERN Director General; 1976 – 1980 with John Adams (Physicist)	Succeeded by Herwig Schopper
