= Bernard Gregory =

French physicist (1919–1977)

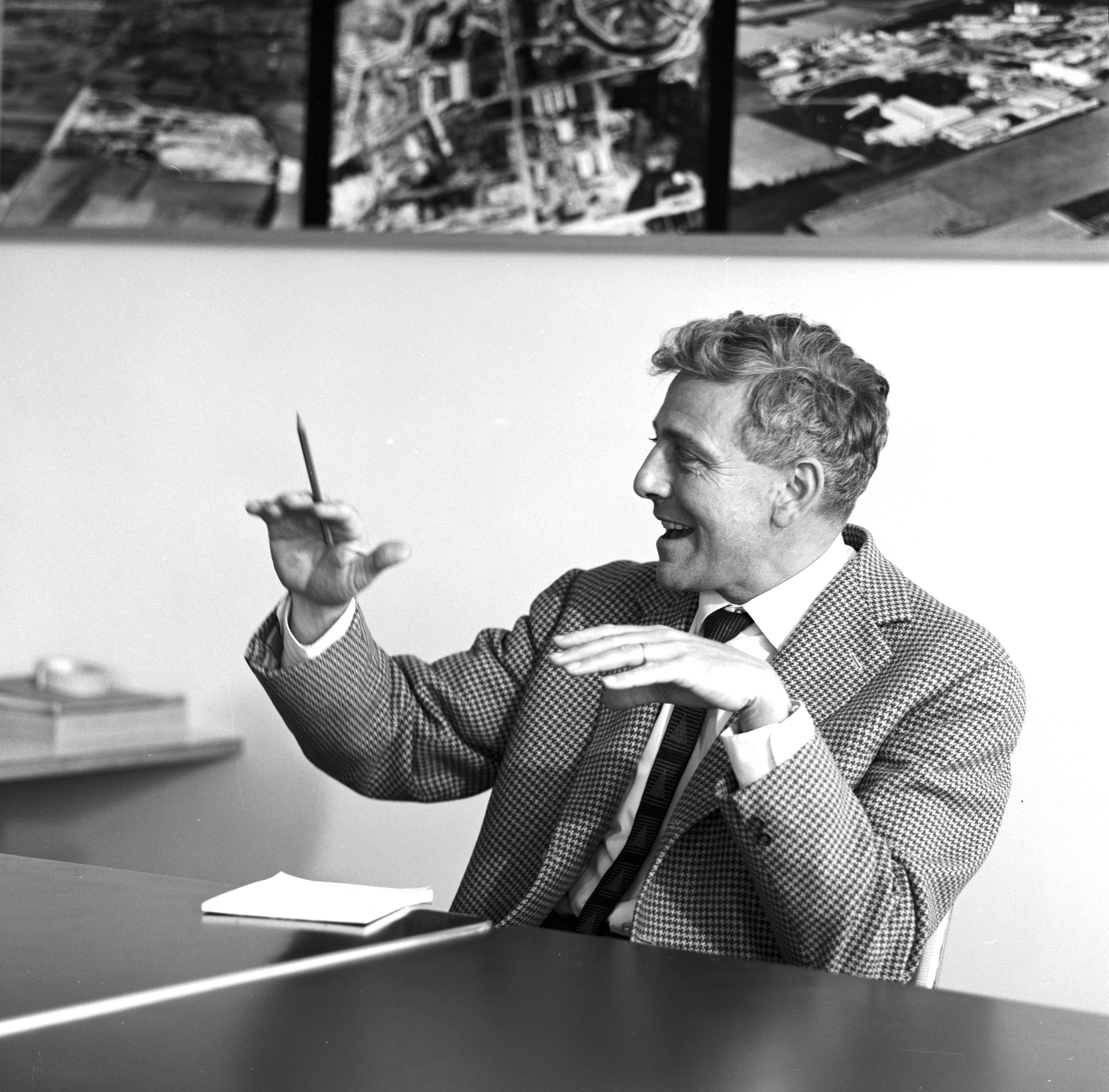
- Gregory in 1966
- Born: 19 January 1919; Bergerac, France
- Died: 24 December 1977 (aged 58); Élancourt, France
- Occupations: French physicist and former CERN Director-General

Bernard Paul Gregory (19 January 1919 – 24 December 1977) was a prominent French physicist and director-general of CERN.

During World War II, Gregory was a prisoner of war in a German camp for military officers. After the war he graduated from the École Polytechnique and École Nationale Supérieure des Mines de Paris, then went to the United States to study fundamental particle interactions in high-energy cosmic rays.

After earning his Ph.D. in 1950 at MIT, under the supervision of Professor Bruno Rossi, Gregory returned to France. He became known in the high energy physics world in the 1950s when he worked as a researcher, with the title of deputy director, under Professor Leprince- Ringuet at the École Polytechnique. At the École Polytechnique he worked with a number of physicists including Charles Peyrou, Jean Crussard (1911-1986), André Lagarrigue, and later André Astier.

In 1958, Gregory was appointed professor of physics at Polytechnique. Around 1960, Gregory got involved in the bubble chambers research. He directed the work on the 81 cm Saclay Bubble Chamber, developed by the technical services at Saturne for the laboratory of the École Polytechnique, and was subsequently brought to CERN PS in Geneva.

He was Directorate Member for Research at CERN from 1964 to 1965. From 1966 to 1970, he was Director General of CERN. At CERN, he supervised most of the construction of the world's first hadron collider, the Intersecting Storage Rings (ISR).

Following his mandate as CERN Director-General, Gregory returned to the Polytechnique laboratory in Paris. Soon he became director-general of the National Center for Scientific Research (CNRS), which he led from 1973 to 1976. The same year, he became Délégué général à la Recherche scientifique et technique (DGRST). Gregory was the first chair of the International Committee for Future Accelerators, a working group of the International Union of Pure and Applied Physics. He was elected president for the CERN Council for 1978, but died before entering this position.

There is a street, Route Gregory, named after Gregory at the CERN Meyrin site.

Business positions
Preceded by Victor Weisskopf	Director General of CERN; 1966-1970	Succeeded by Willibald Jentschke and John Adams (Co-directors)
