= Synchrocyclotron =

Special type of cyclic particle accelerator

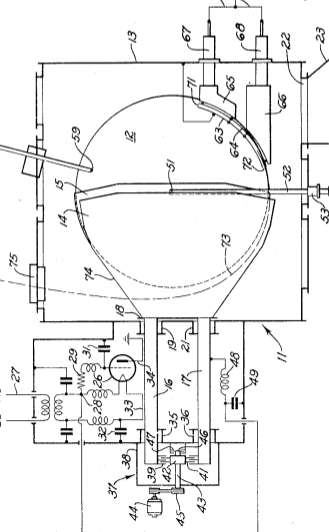
Sketch of a synchrocyclotron from McMillan's patent.

A synchrocyclotron is a special type of cyclotron, patented by Edwin McMillan in 1952, in which the frequency of the driving RF electric field is varied to compensate for relativistic effects as the particles' velocity begins to approach the speed of light. This is in contrast to the classical cyclotron, where this frequency is constant.

There are two major differences between the synchrocyclotron and the classical cyclotron. In the synchrocyclotron, only one dee (hollow D-shaped sheet metal electrode) retains its classical shape, while the other pole is open (see patent sketch). Furthermore, the frequency of oscillating electric field in a synchrocyclotron is decreasing continuously instead of kept constant so as to maintain cyclotron resonance for relativistic velocities. One terminal of the oscillating electric potential varying periodically is applied to the dee and the other terminal is on ground potential. The protons or deuterons to be accelerated are made to move in circles of increasing radius. The acceleration of particles takes place as they enter or leave the dee. At the outer edge, the ion beam can be removed with the aid of electrostatic deflector. The first synchrocyclotron produced 195 MeV deuterons and 390 MeV α-particles.

== Differences from the classical cyclotron ==
In a classical cyclotron, the angular frequency of the electric field is given by

$$\omega = \frac{q B}{m}$$,

Where $\omega$ is the angular frequency of the electric field, $q$ is the charge on the particle, $B$ is the magnetic field, and $m$ is the mass of the particle. This makes the assumption that the particle is classical, and does not experience relativistic phenomena such as length contraction. These effects start to become significant when $v$, the velocity of the particle greater than $\approx \frac{c}{3}$. To correct for this, the relativistic mass is used instead of the rest mass; thus, a factor of $\gamma$ multiplies the mass, such that

$$\omega = \frac{q B}{m \gamma}$$,

where

$$\gamma = \frac{1}{\sqrt{1-\frac{v^2}{c^2}}}$$.

This is then the angular frequency of the field applied to the particles as they are accelerated around the synchrocyclotron.

== Advantages ==
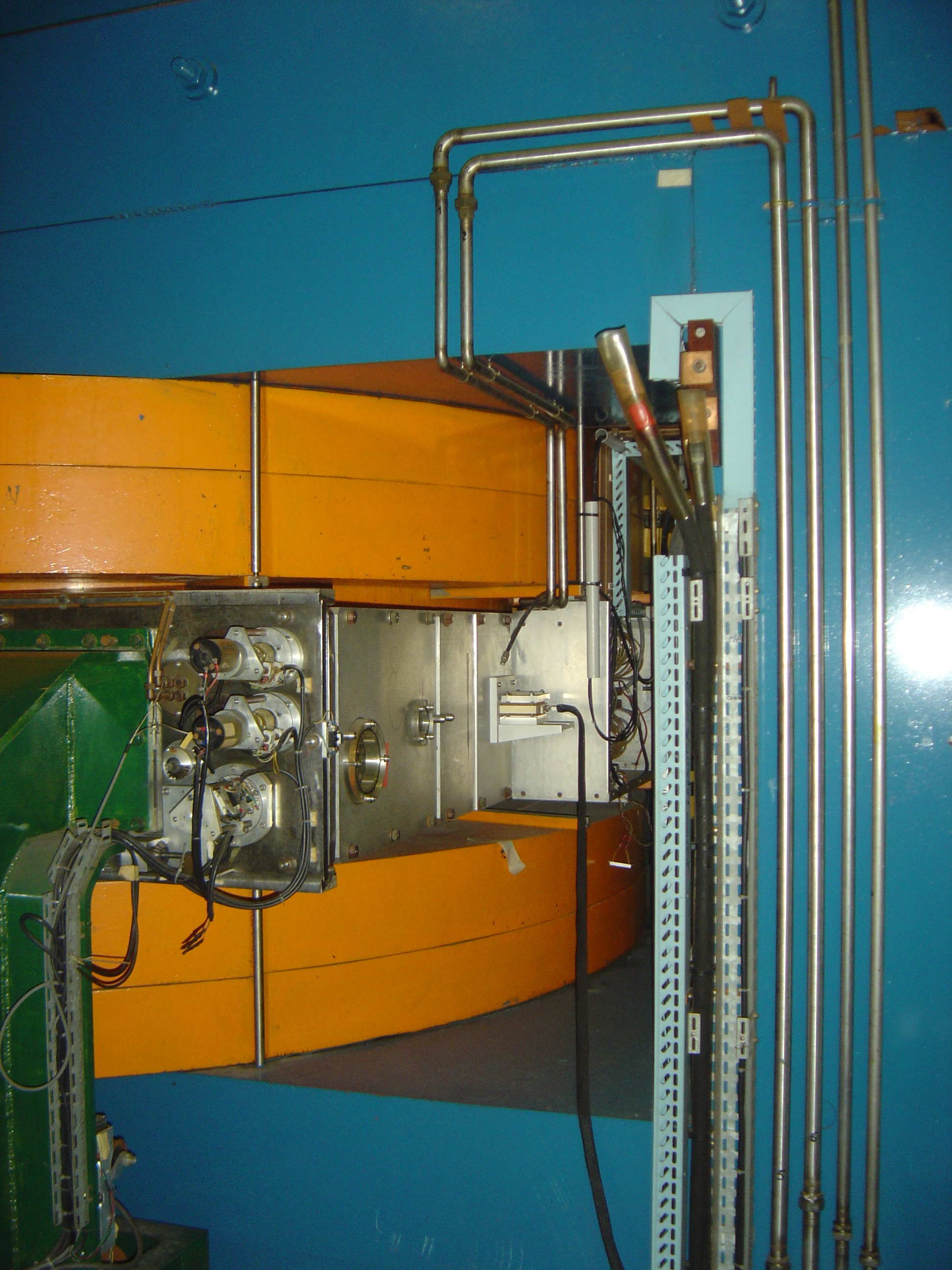
A part of the former Orsay synchrocyclotron

The chief advantage of the synchrocyclotron is that there is no need to restrict the number of revolutions executed by the ion before its exit. As such, the potential difference supplied between the dees can be much smaller.

The smaller potential difference needed across the gap has the following uses:

1. There is no need for a narrow gap between the dees as in the case of conventional cyclotron, because strong electric fields for producing large acceleration are not required. Thus only one dee can be used instead of two, the other end of the oscillating voltage supply being connected to earth.
2. The magnetic pole pieces can be brought closer, thus making it possible to increase greatly the magnetic flux density.
3. The frequency valve oscillator is able to function with much greater efficiency.

== Disadvantages ==
The main drawback of this device is that, as a result of the variation in the frequency of the oscillating voltage supply, only a very small fraction of the ions leaving the source are captured in phase-stable orbits of maximum radius and energy with the result that the output beam current has a low duty cycle, and the average beam current is only a small fraction of the instantaneous beam current. Thus the machine produces high energy ions, though with comparatively low intensity.

The next development step of the cyclotron concept, the isochronous cyclotron, maintains a constant RF driving frequency and compensates for relativistic effects by increasing the magnetic field with radius. Isochronous cyclotrons are capable of producing much greater beam current than synchrocyclotrons. As a result, isochronous cyclotrons became more popular in the research field.

== History ==
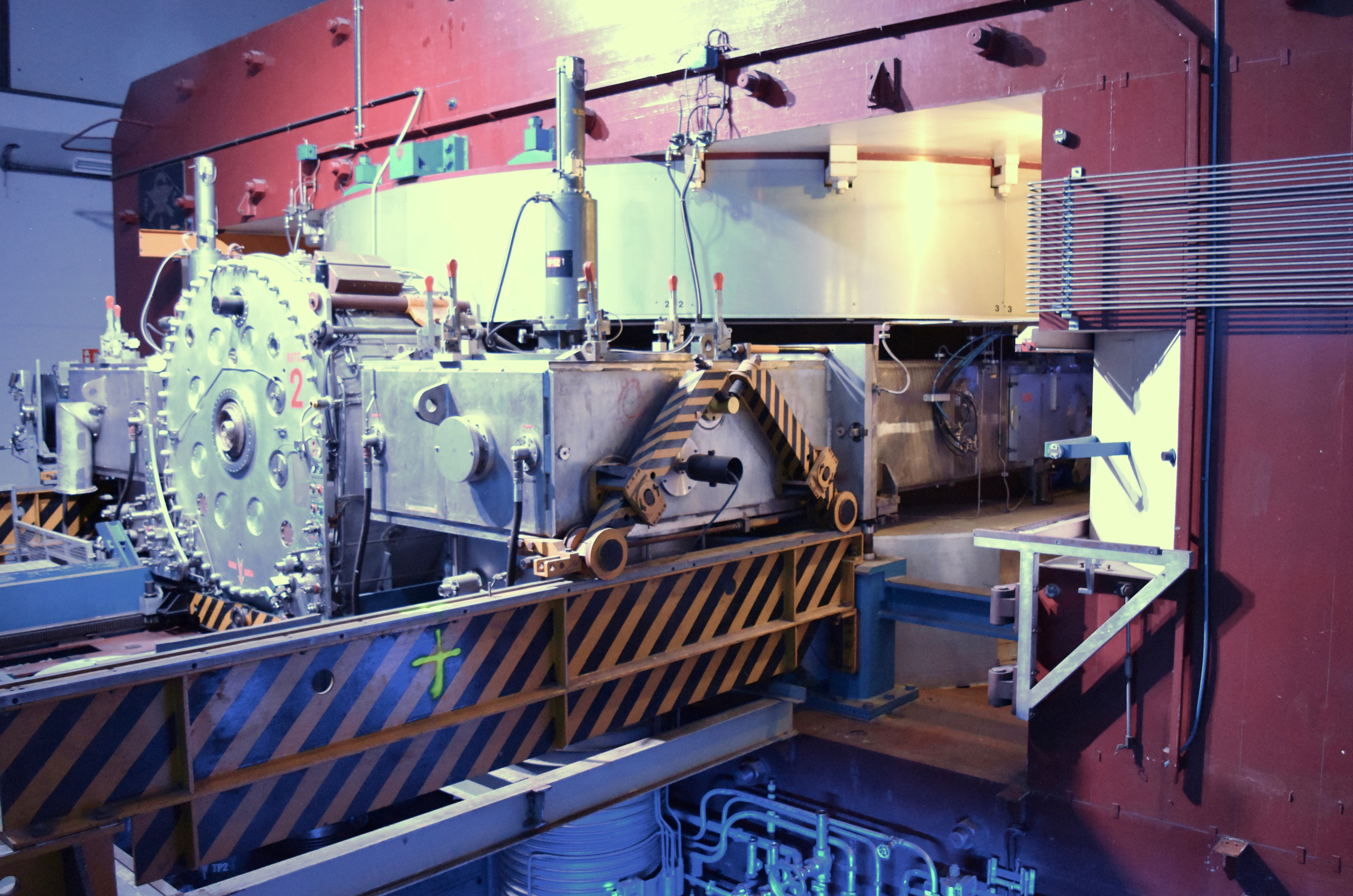
The Synchrocyclotron (SC) at CERN

In 1945, Robert Lyster Thornton at Ernest Lawrence's Radiation Laboratory led the construction of the 184-inch (470 cm) 730 MeV cyclotron. In 1946, he oversaw the conversion of the cyclotron to the new design made by McMillan which would become the first synchrocyclotron with could produce 195 MeV deuterons and 390 MeV α-particles.

After the first synchrocyclotron was operational, the Office of Naval Research (ONR) funded two synchrocyclotron construction initiatives. The first funding was in 1946 for Carnegie Institute of Technology to build a 435-MeV synchrocyclotron led by Edward Creutz and to start its nuclear physics research program. The second initiative was in 1947 for University of Chicago to build a 450-MeV synchrocyclotron under the direction of Enrico Fermi.

In 1948, University of Rochester completed the construction of its 240-MeV synchrocyclotron, followed by a completion of 380-MeV synchrocyclotron at Columbia University in 1950.

In 1950 the 435-MeV synchrocyclotron at Carnegie Institute of Technology was operational, followed by 450-MeV synchrocyclotron of University of Chicago in 1951.

The construction of the 400-Mev synchrocyclotron at the University of Liverpool was completed in 1952 and by April 1954 it was operational. The Liverpool synchrocyclotron first demonstrated the extraction of a particle beam from such a machine, removing the constraint of having to fit experiments inside the synchrocyclotron.

At a UNESCO meeting in Paris in December 1951, there was a discussion on finding a solution to have a medium-energy accelerator for the soon-to-be-formed European Organization for Nuclear Research (CERN). The synchrocyclotron was proposed as a solution to bridge the gap before the 28-GeV Proton Synchrotron was completed. In 1952, Cornelis Bakker led the group to design and construct the synchrocyclotron named Synchro-Cyclotron (SC) at CERN. The design of the Synchro-Cyclotron with 15.7 metres (52 ft) in circumference started in 1953. The construction started in 1954 and it achieved 600 MeV proton acceleration in August 1957, with the experimental program started in April 1958.

== Current developments ==
Synchrocyclotrons are attractive for use in proton therapy because of the ability to make compact systems using high magnetic fields. Medical physics companies Ion Beam Applications and Mevion Medical Systems have developed superconducting synchrocyclotrons that can fit comfortably into hospitals.
