= Herwig Schopper =

German experimental physicist (1924–2025)

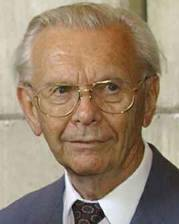
- Schopper in 2013
- Born: 28 February 1924; Lanškroun, Czechoslovakia
- Died: 19 August 2025 (aged 101); Hamburg, Germany
- Education: University of Hamburg
- Known for: First polarised proton beam; Circular polarisation of gamma-rays following beta decay; Hadron calorimeter; Superconducting cavities; High energy e-p scattering
- Awards: Order of Friendship (1996); Order of Merit of the Federal Republic of Germany ¡ Order of Independence; UNESCO Niels Bohr Medal; AAAS Award for Science Diplomacy
- Scientific career
- Fields: Optics; Nuclear physics; Particle physics; Accelerator technology
- Workplaces: DESY; CERN; SESAME; University of Erlangen; University of Mainz; University of Karlsruhe; University of Hamburg
- Doctoral advisor: Wilhelm Lenz; Rudolf Fleischmann

Herwig Franz Schopper (28 February 1924 – 19 August 2025) was a German experimental physicist. He researched and taught at the University of Erlangen, the University of Mainz from 1958, the University of Karlsruhe from 1961, and the University of Hamburg from 1973. The same year, he became chairman of the directorate of the German DESY research centre. He was the director general of CERN for European research from 1981 to 1988. After retiring in Hamburg in 1989, he held functions such as president of the German Physical Society and president of the European Physical Society. He was a founding father of SESAME, an international laboratory in the Middle East, and of the Cyprus Institute.

== Early life ==
Schopper was born in Lanškroun, Czechoslovakia, on 28 February 1924, to a family of Austrian descent; his father was a teacher. He grew up in a German-speaking town in the newly founded Czechoslovakia. A few years after Schopper's birth, his parents amicably divorced, and he lived with his mother during the week and with his father on weekends. His parents and relatives encouraged his scientific and musical interests.

Schopper was advanced one year early into secondary school and took his final exams in 1942, after being taught alone in his last year because his classmates had left school early with an emergency diploma. In 1938, following the annexation of the Sudetenland as a result of the Munich Agreement, Schopper had become a German citizen. After completing school, he was conscripted into the Reich Labour Service and then drafted into the Wehrmacht, where he was assigned to the Luftwaffe's intelligence service. He chose a career as an officer, which meant alternating between training and combat service (twice on the Eastern Front, then in the West during the Ardennes Offensive). At the end of the war, Schopper was taken prisoner by the British in Schleswig-Holstein.

== Life and career ==
In the autumn of 1945, he began studying physics at the University of Hamburg. It was here where he obtained his diploma in physics (1949) and his doctorate (1951), studying under Wilhelm Lenz and Rudolf Fleischmann. In 1950/51 he was a research assistant with Lise Meitner at Stockholm and in 1956/57 at the Cavendish Laboratory under Otto Robert Frisch.

During these fellowships, Schopper worked on nuclear physics and contributed substantially to the evidence of parity violation in weak interactions. He measured the circular polarization of gamma rays following a beta decay, thought unfeasible by Lee and Yang, and showed in the same experiment that the helicities of neutrino and antineutrino are opposite. Later, he was involved in an experiment to test time reversal symmetry. In 1956, he followed Fleischmann to the University of Erlangen where he continued to do research in optics and solid-state physics, with emphasis on thin metal layers, which he had started at Hamburg. Also he developed, along with Clausnitzer, the first source of polarised protons. In 1957 he became Privatdozent at the University of Erlangen.

From 1958 to 1961, Schopper was an associate professor at the University of Mainz where he established the Institute for Experimental Nuclear Physics. In 1960 and 1961 he worked under Robert R. Wilson at Cornell University to be introduced to elementary particle physics, namely the use of electron scattering to study the structure of the proton and neutron.

Schopper was appointed professor at the University of Karlsruhe in 1961 and director of the newly established Institutes for Experimental Nuclear Physics of TH Karlsruhe and the Karlsruhe Nuclear Research Centre. In order to continue his research on electron scattering he set up a group to carry out one of the first experiments at DESY. He also created a group at CERN to investigate neutron scattering at high energies at the Proton Synchrotron (PS) and Intersecting Storage Rings (ISR). These experiments where then continued at the Institute for High Energy Physics (IHEP) in Serpukhov, Russia. The group made important contributions to the study of neutron-proton and neutron-nuclei scattering cross sections. For this purpose, the first hadron calorimeter was developed and optimised by Monte Carlo simulations. Another group at Karlsruhe developed the first superconducting high frequency cavities in Europe, a technology which was transferred to CERN for particle separators and later for particle acceleration at LEP.

== At CERN ==
At CERN, he was a research associate in 1966–67, became division leader of the Nuclear Physics Division in 1970, member of the directorate responsible for the co-ordination of the experimental programme until 1973 and chairman of the ISR Committee from 1973 to 1976.

In 1973 Schopper became professor at the University of Hamburg and the chairman of the directorate of DESY, serving until end of 1980. He was responsible for the installation of the ARGUS detector at DORIS which later resulted in the first evidence of B – B bar mixing. Also, by establishing HASYLAB at DORIS synchrotron light science became an important branch of research at DESY. He proposed and completed the construction of the electron-positron collider PETRA which led to the discovery and study of the gluon. During his mandate, DESY, a national laboratory became as far as science was concerned an international particle physics laboratory. This included the start of the first collaboration with China.

From 1977 to 1979, Schopper was chairman of the Association of the German Large Research Centres (now Helmholtz Association) and member of various advisory bodies of the Federal Ministry of Research, the Deutsche Forschungs Gemeinschaft and the Max Planck Society.

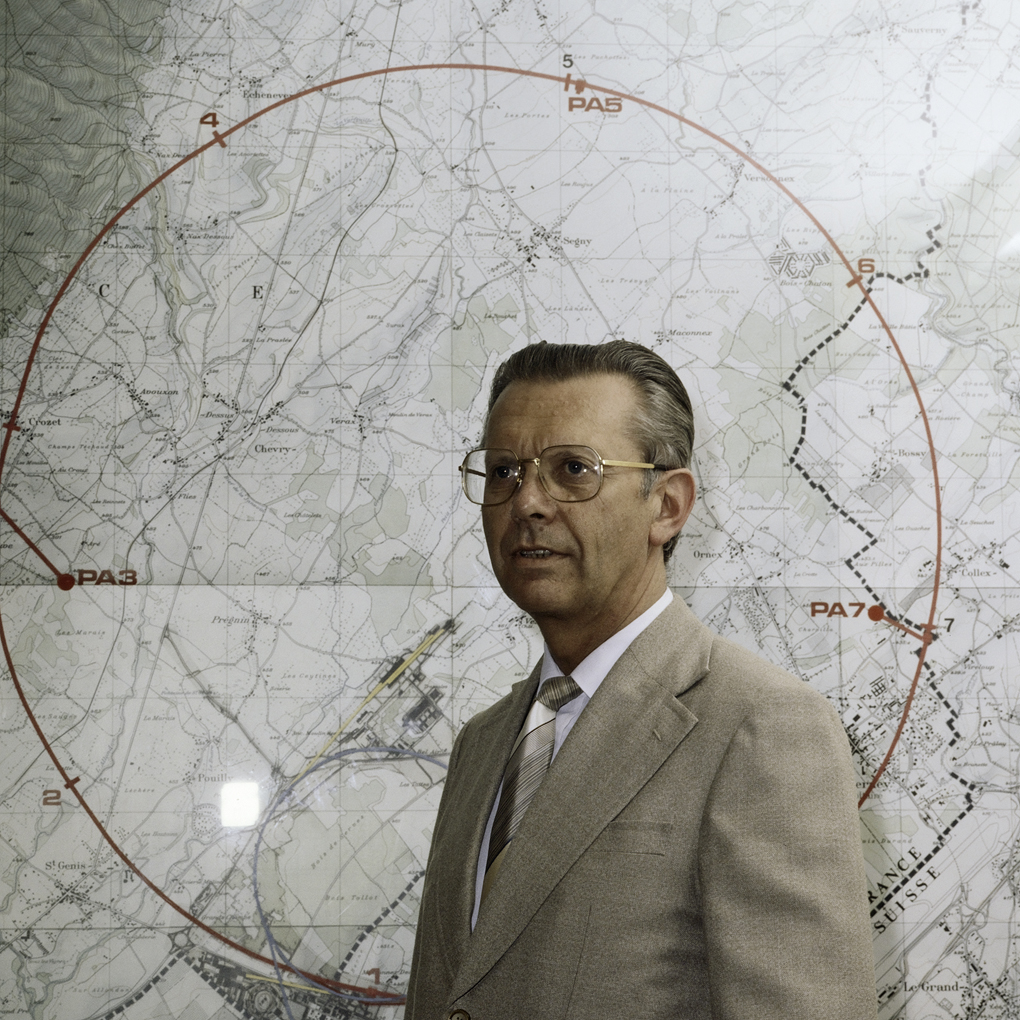
Schopper in 1982

After being member of the Scientific Policy Committee at CERN, Schopper was elected director general and served from 1981 to 1988. His first task was to unite the two CERN laboratories existing at that time under two Directors General. The Large Electron–Positron Collider (LEP) was also proposed and constructed under his leadership. This facility allowed the verification of the standard model of particle physics, namely that it is a renormalizable field theory, leading to the award of the Nobel Prize to the theoreticians Veltman and t'Hooft. Furthermore, it enabled the precise determination of fundamental parameters of the electroweak force, such as the W± and Z masses, and proved the existence of three neutrino families. Thus, this particle accelerator transformed high energy physics into a field of precision measurements and provided estimates to the mass of the top quark, Higgs boson and other supersymmetric and hypothetical particles. LEP was approved under the condition of a reduced and constant budget with the consequence that some unique activities at CERN (e.g. ISR) had to be abandoned. Schopper was obliged to introduce a new way of international collaboration for the four LEP experiments since CERN could not provide funds for them. The experiments became rather independent activities organised in a rather democratic way bringing together hundreds of scientists from many universities and national organisations. The LEP experiments became a model for the later LHC experiments, shaping the way this organization works today. He contributed to the globalisation of research at CERN and was also responsible for the return of Spain and Portugal in the CERN's member states.

== Later life and work ==
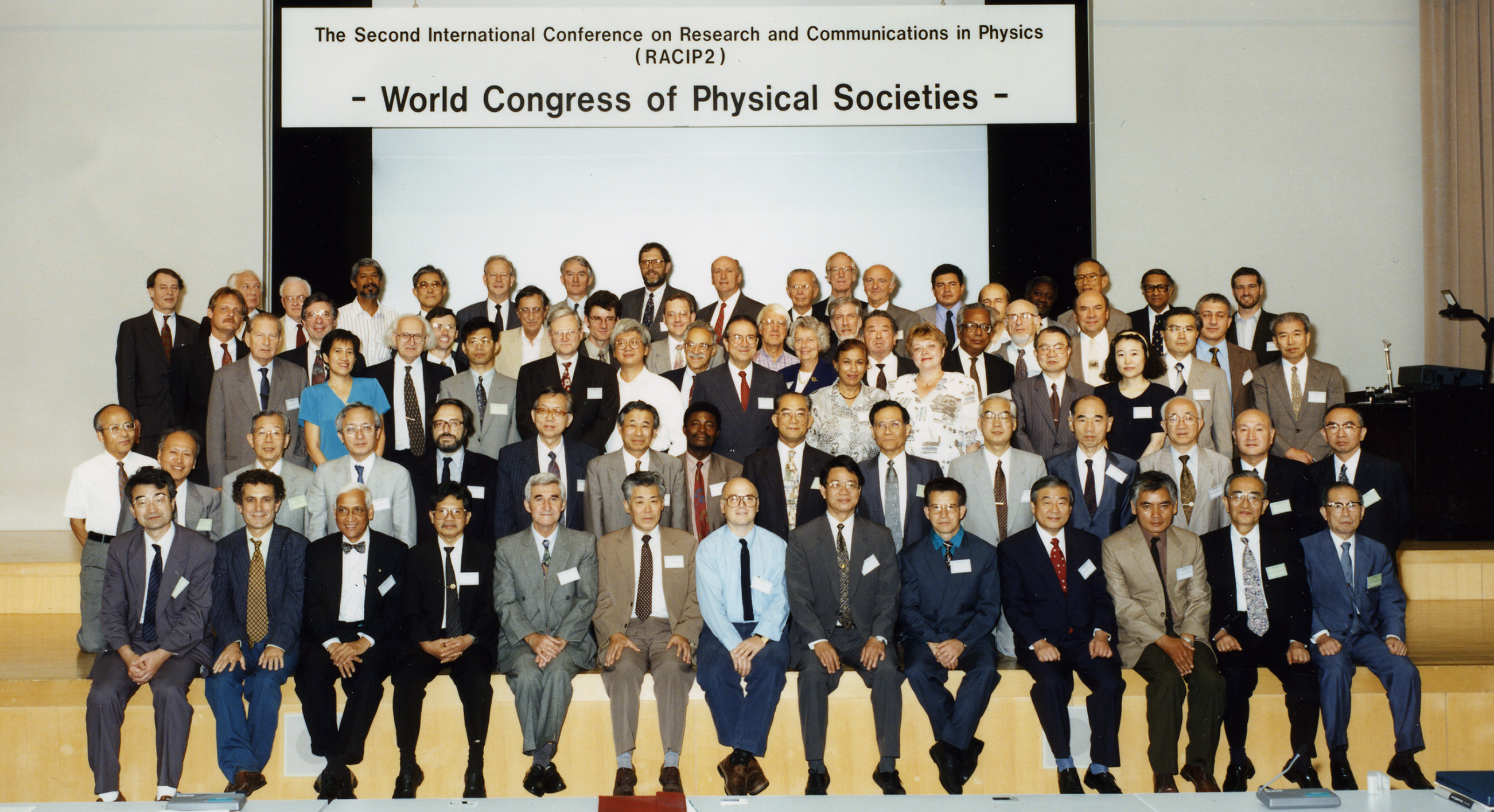
Schopper at the Second International Conference on Research and Communications in Physics

Schopper was professor at the University of Hamburg from 1973 and professor emeritus from 1989. From 1992 to 1994, he was president of the German Physical Society and president of the European Physical Society in 1995–97. For many years he was member of the scientific council of the Joint Institute for Nuclear Research in Dubna and of the board of trustees of the Max Planck Institute for Plasma Physics in Garching.

At UNESCO, he served as member of the Physics Action Council and chairman of the Working Group on Large Facilities, president of the scientific council of the Regional Office for Science and Technology ROSTE of UNESCO in Venice (2001–2002) and in 2003–2009 he was the chairman of the international advisory committee for the International Basic Science Programs.

Schopper's vision of science without borders resulted in him becoming a founding father of SESAME, the laboratory for Synchrotron-Light for Experimental Science and Applications in the Middle East, which provides an extremely bright light source to investigate a broad range of domains from condensed matter to biology and archeology. In 1999–2008 he became president of the Preliminary International Council and later, after the formal foundation of SESAME, of the International Council. Without his dedication this international research facility would probably not have been built. SESAME was founded analogous to CERN, under the umbrella of UNESCO, with presently nine member states: Bahrain, Cyprus, Egypt, Iran, Israel, Jordan, Pakistan, the Palestinian Authority and Turkey. It provides an environment where countries with different political systems, traditions, religions and mentalities are able to work together peacefully.

Schopper was a founding member of The Cyprus Institute at Nicosia, Cyprus, and from 2000, a Member of the board of trustees. He was also chairman of the Scientific Council, and member of the executive committee of the board of trustees of the Cyprus Institute. He later worked as an advisor and goodwill ambassador on science for peace. He wrote articles about research policy, science and religion, and also science and society.

Schopper died in Hamburg on 19 August 2025, at the age of 101.

== Honours and awards ==
=== Honorary academic degrees ===
Schopper received honorary doctoral degrees from: University of Erlangen (1982), Moscow State University (1988), University of Geneva (1989), University of London, Joint Institute for Nuclear Research (Dubna) (1999), Institute for High Energy Physics (Protvino), The Cyprus Institute (Nicosia) (2018) and the Karlsruhe Institute of Technology (KIT) (2024).

=== Awards ===
- Physics Prize of Göttingen Academy of Sciences and Humanities (1957)
- Carus Medal of the Academy of Sciences Leopoldina in Halle (1957)
- Ritter-von-Gerstner-Medaille (1978)
- Sudetendeutscher Kulturpreis (1984)
- Golden Plate Award of the American Academy of Achievement (USA) (1985)
- Gold Medal of the Weizmann Institute (Israel) with CERN (1985)
- Commander's Cross of the Order of Merit of the Federal Republic of Germany (1989)
- Wilhelm Exner Medal (Austria) (1991)
- J. E. Purkyne Memorial Medal of the Czech Academy of Sciences (1994)
- Order of Friendship of the Russian Federation awarded by President Yeltsin (1996)
- Grand Cordon of the Order of Independence awarded by King Abdullah II of Jordan (2003)
- Tate Medal of the American Institute of Physics (2003)
- UNESCO Albert Einstein Gold Medal, Denmark (2004)
- Silver Medal of SESAME International Council (2004)
- UNESCO Niels Bohr Gold Medal (2005)
- Scientific Merit Medal, Portugal (2009)
- Physics Medal of first grade of the Czech Physical Society and Union of Czech Mathematicians and Physicists (2010)
- Grand Cross of the Order of Merit of the Republic of Cyprus (2012)
- Golden Honorary Needle of DESY (Hamburg) (2013)
- AAAS Award for Science Diplomacy (2019)
- Goldmedal of the Heisenberg Society (2024)

=== Memberships ===
- Academy of Sciences Leopoldina in Halle
- Academia Europaea in London from 1992
- Academia Scientiarium et Artium Europea in Salzburg
- Corresponding member of the Bavarian Academy of Sciences in Munich
- Honorary member of the Hungarian Academy of Sciences
- Fellow of the Institute of Physics in London
- Fellow of the American Physical Society
- Academy of Sciences in Lisbon
- Member and trustee of the World Academy of Art and Science in San Francisco
- Honorary Member of the Swiss Physical Society
- Honorary Member of the German Physical Society
- Honorary Member of the Polish Academy of Sciences

== Publications and books ==
=== Scientific publications ===
Schopper wrote more than 200 original publications in optics, nuclear physics, elementary particle physics and accelerator technology, including:

- Fleischmann R. and H. Schopper, The determination of the optical constants and thickness of the layer of absorbent layers by means of the measurement of the absolute phase change Z.Physik 129.285 (1951) (first method for the measurement of the absolute phase upon reflection of light on the thin metal layers)
- H. Schopper, The interpretation of the optical constants of alkali metals, Z.Physik 135, 163 (1953) (the abnormal optical behaviour of thin alkali metal layers does not require a special physical state of the metal)
- H. Schopper, Circular polarization of gamma rays: Further proof for parity failure in beta-decay, Phil.Mag. 2, 710 (1957) (One of the experiments proposed by Lee and Yang, but considered impossible. In this experiment it was shown for the first time that the helicity of the neutrino and antineutrino are opposite.)
- G. Clausnitzer, R. Fleischmann and H. Schopper, Production of a hydrogen atom beam with parallel nuclear spins, Z.Physik 144, 336 (1956)
- H. Schopper and S. Galster, The circular polarization of internal and external bremsstrahlung, Nucl.Phys. 6, 125 (1958) (first measurement of the circular polarization of the internal bremsstrahlung of beta decay)
- J. Halbritter, R. Hietschold, P. Kneisel, and H. Schopper, Coupling losses and the measurement of Q-values of superconducting cavities, KFK-report Karlsruhe 3 / 86-6 (1968) (early publication of the study of superconducting cavities to accelerate particles)
- R. M. Littauer, H. Schopper, R. R. Wilson, Electromagnetic properties of the proton and neutron, Phys. Rev. Lett. 6, 286 (1961), Phys. Rev. Lett. 7, 141 (1961) and 7, 144 (1961) (measurement of nuclear form factors, improvement of the first measurements by R. Hofstadter)
- Behrend et al., Elastic electron-proton scattering at momentum transfers up to 110 fermi-2, Nuov.Cim. 48.140 (1967)
- J. Engler, W. Flauger, AS. Gibbard, F. Mönnig, K. Runge and H. Schopper, A total absorption spectrometer for energy measurements of high-energy particles, Nucl.Instr.Meth. 106, 189 (1973) (first usage and optimization of a 'hadron calorimeter')
- V. Boehmer et al., Neutron-proton elastic scattering from 10 to 70 GeV / c, Nucl.Phys. B91, 266 (1975) and other publications (neutron-proton scattering at high energies, the ISR at CERN and at the Institute for High Energy Physics in Protvino, Russia)
- L3 Collaboration, Upsilon production in Z decays, Phys.Lett. B 413, 167 (1997) and Heavy Quarkonium Production in Z decays, CERN-PPE/92-99 and Phys.Lett.B (Schopper was principal author of these publications)
- H.Schopper, The light of SESAME: A dream becomes reality, La Rivista del Nuovo Cimento, 40, 199 (2017)

=== Books ===
- H. Schopper, Matter and Antimatter, Pieper Verlag (1989)
- H. Schopper, LEP — The Lord of the Rings Collider at CERN 1980–2000, Springer Verlag (2009); with a foreword by Rolf-Dieter Heuer; ISBN 978-3-540-89300-4; e-book ISBN 978-3-540-89301-1
- H. Schopper and L. Di Lella, editors, 60 years of CERN Experiments and Discoveries, World Scientific (2015); pbk ISBN 978-9814663182
- Schopper, Herwig; Gillies, James (2024). Herwig Schopper: Scientist and Diplomat in a Changing World. Springer. Bibcode:2024hssd.book.....S. doi:10.1007/978-3-031-51042-7. ISBN 978-3-031-51042-7.

Business positions
Preceded by Léon Van Hove and John Adams (co-directors)	CERN Director General; 1981–1988	Succeeded by Carlo Rubbia
