= Lawrence Biedenharn =

American mathematician

Lawrence Christian Biedenharn, Jr. (18 November 1922, Vicksburg, Mississippi – 12 February 1996, Austin, Texas) was an American theoretical nuclear physicist and mathematical physicist, a leading expert on applications of Lie group theory to physics.

Biedenharn studied at MIT with an interruption in World War II from 1942 to 1946 as a lieutenant in the Signal Corps in the Pacific theater, where in 1946 he was stationed in Tokyo for a year as a radio officer. He received his bachelor's degree in absentia from MIT. After World War II, he returned to MIT where he received his PhD in physics under Victor Weisskopf in 1950. As an MIT graduate student he shared an office with J. David Jackson, then a graduate student, and John Blatt, then a post-doc. Biedenharn was employed at Oak Ridge National Laboratory, became an assistant professor at Yale University, and then an associate professor at Rice University. From 1961 he was a professor at Duke University, where he became in 1987 "James B. Duke Professor", and then retired in 1992 as professor emeritus. He remained active in teaching and research as an adjunct professor at the University of Texas, Austin. In 1996 he died from kidney cancer.

Biedenharn is known for his contributions to the quantum theory of angular momentum, especially the theory of nuclear reactions and Coulomb excitations (excitations of atoms by the scattering of charged particles and the Coulomb interaction with the nucleus). In the later part of his career, he worked on representation of quantum groups. From 1985 to 1993 he was the chief editor of the Journal of Mathematical Physics. For many years Hendrik van Dam was his co-editor.

In 1958 Biedenharn was a Fulbright Fellow and a Guggenheim Fellow. He received the Jesse W. Beams Award in 1979 and twice received (1976 and 1987) the Humboldt Prize.

In 1950 he married Sarah Willingham, who became a lawyer; they had a son and a daughter.

== Selected works ==
- with John Blatt: Blatt, John; Biedenharn, L. (1952). "Angular distribution of scattering and reaction cross sections". Rev. Mod. Phys. 24 (4): 258–272. Bibcode:1952RvMP...24..258B. doi:10.1103/RevModPhys.24.258.
- with J. Blatt, M. E. Rose: Biedenharn, L.; Blatt, J.; Rose, M. (1952). "Some properties of Racah and associated coefficients". Rev. Mod. Phys. 24 (4): 249–257. Bibcode:1952RvMP...24..249B. doi:10.1103/RevModPhys.24.249.
- with Morris Edgar Rose: Biedenharn, L.; Rose, M. (1953). "Theory of angular correlation of nuclear radiation". Rev. Mod. Phys. 25 (3): 729. Bibcode:1953RvMP...25..729B. doi:10.1103/RevModPhys.25.729.
- with Pieter Johannes Brussaard: Coulomb Excitations, Oxford University Press 1965
- with J. D. Louck: Angular Momentum in Quantum Physics, Addison-Wesley 1981
- with J. D. Louck: Racah-Wigner Algebra in Quantum Theory, Addison-Wesley 1981
- with J. D. Louck: Biedenharn, L. C.; Louck, J. D. (Feb 1990). "Inhomogeneous basis set of symmetric polynomials defined by tableaux". Proc Natl Acad Sci U S A. 87 (4): 1441–1445. Bibcode:1990PNAS...87.1441B. doi:10.1073/pnas.87.4.1441. PMC 53491. PMID 11607064.
- with Max Lohe: Quantum Group Symmetry and q-Tensor Algebras, World Scientific 1995; 1999 reprint ISBN 981-02-2331-5
- as editor with Hendrik van Dam: Quantum Theory of Angular Momentum: A Collection of Reprints and Original Papers, Academic Press 1965
