= Bloch oscillation =

Phenomenon from solid state physics

Time-resolved simulation of a pulse undergoing Bloch oscillations.

Bloch oscillation is a phenomenon from solid state physics. It describes the oscillation of a particle (e.g. an electron) confined in a periodic potential when a constant force is acting on it. It was first pointed out by Felix Bloch and Clarence Zener while studying the electrical properties of crystals. In particular, they predicted that the motion of electrons in a perfect crystal under the action of a constant electric field would be oscillatory instead of uniform. While in natural crystals this phenomenon is extremely hard to observe due to the scattering of electrons by lattice defects, it has been observed in semiconductor superlattices and in different physical systems such as cold atoms in an optical potential and ultrasmall Josephson junctions.

== Derivation ==
The one-dimensional equation of motion for an electron with wave vector $k$ in a constant electric field $E$ is:
$$\frac{dp}{dt} = \hbar \frac{dk}{dt} = -eE,$$
which has the solution
$$k(t) = k(0) - \frac{eE}{\hbar} t.$$

The group velocity $v$ of the electron is given by
$$v(k)=\frac{1}{\hbar}\frac{d\mathcal{E}}{dk},$$
where $\mathcal{E}(k)$ denotes the dispersion relation for the given energy band. Suppose that the latter has the (tight-binding) form
$$\mathcal{E}(k)= A \cos{ak} ,$$
where $a$ is the lattice parameter and $A$ is a constant. Then $v(k)$ is given by
$$v(k) = \frac{1}{\hbar} \frac{d\mathcal{E}}{dk} = -\frac{Aa}{\hbar} \sin{ak},$$
and the electron position $x$ can be computed as a function of time:
$$x(t) = \int_0^t {v(k(t'))}{dt'} = x(0) + \frac{A}{eE} \cos\left(\frac{aeE}{\hbar}t\right).$$

This shows that the electron oscillates in real space. The angular frequency of the oscillations is given by $\omega_B = ae|E| / \hbar$.

== Discovery and experimental realizations ==
Bloch oscillations were predicted by Nobel laureate Felix Bloch in 1929. However, they were not experimentally observed for a long time, because in natural solid-state bodies, $\omega_B$ is (even with very high electric field strengths) not large enough to allow for full oscillations of the charge carriers within the diffraction and tunneling times, due to relatively small lattice periods. The development in semiconductor technology has recently led to the fabrication of structures with super lattice periods that are now sufficiently large, based on artificial semiconductors. The oscillation period in those structures is smaller than the diffraction time of the electrons, hence more oscillations can be observed in a time window below the diffraction time. For the first time the experimental observation of Bloch oscillations in such super lattices at very low temperatures was shown by Jochen Feldmann and Karl Leo in 1992. Other realizations were

- the observation of coherent Terahertz radiation of Bloch oscillations by Hartmut Roskos et al. in 1993
- the observation of Bloch oscillations at room temperature by Thomas Dekorsy et al. in 1995
- the observation of Bloch oscillations in the absence of a lattice
- the observation of Bloch oscillations in the classical system of macroscopic pendula

== See also ==
- Super Bloch oscillations
- Semiclassical equations of motion in solid-state physics
