= 81 cm Saclay Bubble Chamber =

Particle detector built in France, 1960

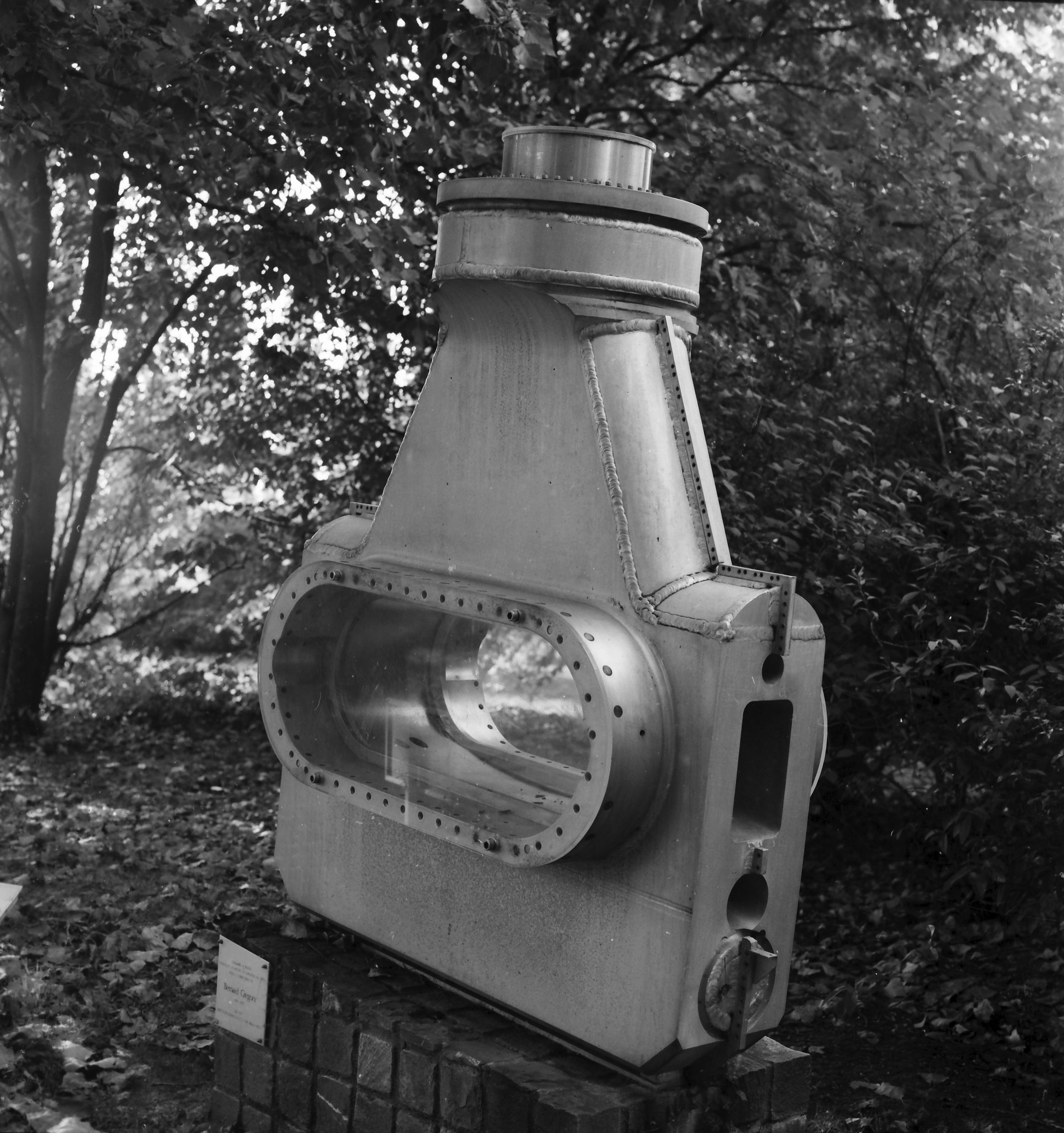
The 81 cm Saclay Bubble Chamber on display at CERN.

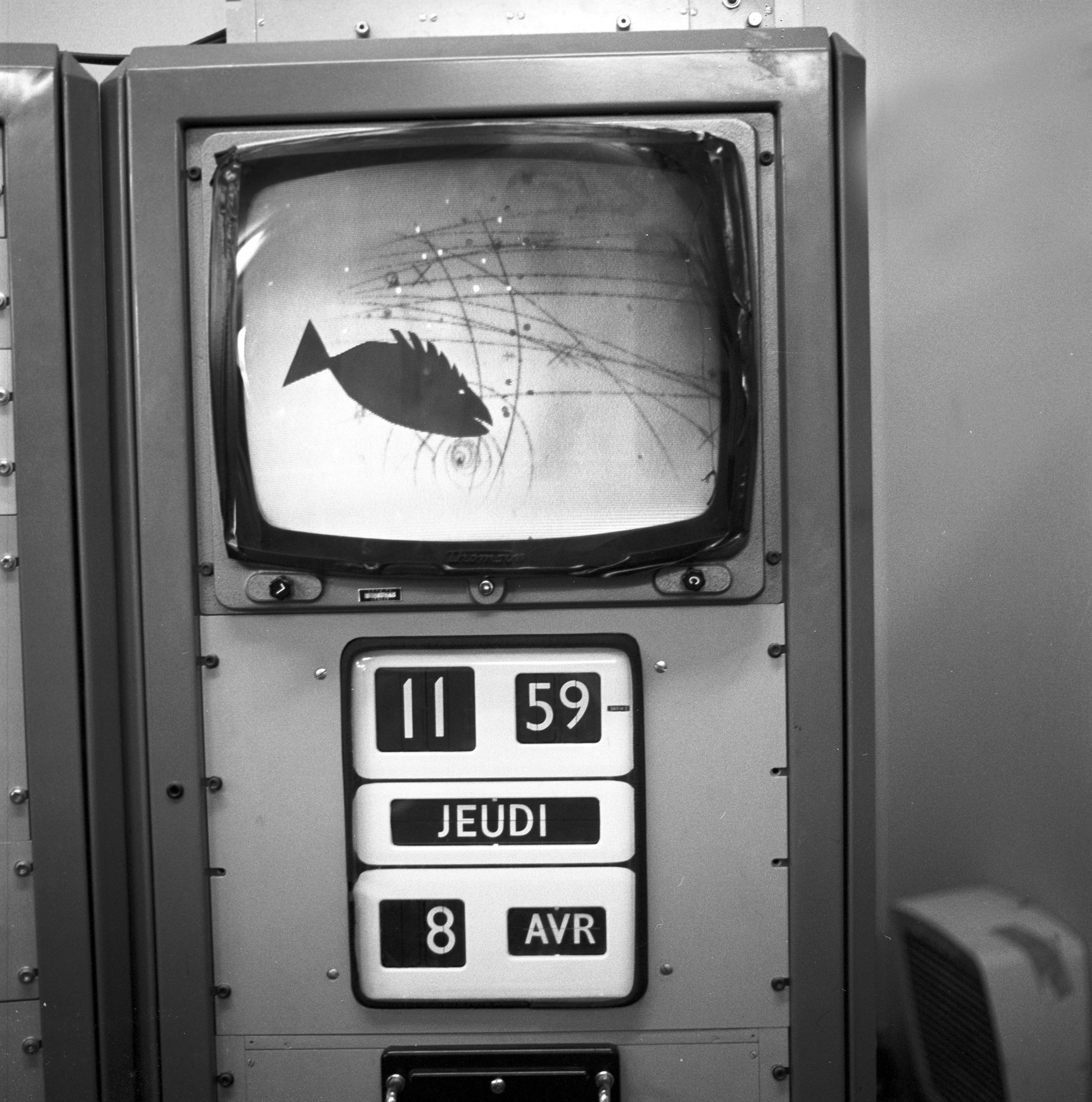
Last photograph taken with the 81 cm Saclay Bubble Chamber. The mysterious presence of a fish casts serious doubt on the origin of all the bubbles and reflects physicists good sense of humour. The photo originates from the retirement celebration of this chamber held at CERN on 8 April 1971.

The 81 cm Saclay Bubble Chamber was a liquid hydrogen bubble chamber built at Saclay, in collaboration with the École Polytechnique (Orsay), to study particle physics. The team led by Bernard Gregory completed the construction of the chamber in 1960 and later it was moved to CERN and installed at the Proton Synchrotron (PS).

A series of experiments began in 1961 which provided data on the properties of hadronic resonances. Firstly, the chamber was irradiated by a beam (rich) of low-energy antiprotons enabling the study of antiproton–proton annihilations at rest. These annihilations generated several bosonic particles and some of them led to the formation of pairs of K mesons. Also, it allowed the study and eventually the discovery of mesonic resonances with emphasis on kaon production. Subsequently, the chamber was exposed to various particles such as π^{+}, π^{−}, K^{+}, K^{−}, and antiprotons, at various momenta up to 10 GeV/c. The experiments with low-energy K^{−} beams resulted in the systematic studies of quasi-elastic reactions on protons directly correlated to strange baryonic resonances. The exposure to higher-energy beams allowed the first evidence of the anti Ξ particle and enabled the discovery and analysis of various mesonic and baryonic resonances. Additionally, in 1963 the chamber started its operation with liquid deuterium, resulting in quasi-elastic reactions of K- on neutrons instead of protons.

An interesting experiment with a K^{−} beam at rest in hydrogen was also carried out to determine Σ-Λ parity, which turned out to be positive, proving the same nature of these particles. Also, it allowed the study of the leptonic decay of Σ^{+} and Σ^{−} particles, and confirmed the validity of the ΔQ/ΔS = +1 rule. It has been assessed that this chamber allowed the identification and study of ten different particles for the first time.

The experiments carried out involved not only most of the CERN member states at the time but also USA, India, Israel, Spain, Czechoslovakia and Poland. Hydrogen liquid filling experiments were: P8, T5, T6, T9, T10, T12, T13, T17, T18, T19, T20, T21, T24, T25, T30, T31, T47, T55, T65, T67, T69, T70, T71, T72, T73, T74, T75, T78, T79, T83, T94, T98, T101, T102, T110, T123, T126, T127, T136, T138, T142, T146, T154, T156, T163, T170, T175, and T206; and using deuterium filling were:T12, T14, T21, T34, T42, T43, T45, T46, T48, T51, T52, T53, T58, T67, T71, T76, T81, T84, T85, T100, T103, T137, T147, T171, and T176.

The chamber operated at CERN on loan from Saclay but in 1966 CERN took full responsibility for the project and a thorough overhaul to the chamber was made. After 10 years of magnificent performance the 81 cm Saclay bubble chamber was decommissioned in 1971. It acquired 16.1 million photographs, 5315 km of film, and approximately 150 thousand million bubbles. It is now situated at the terrace outside Restaurant 1 in CERN.

== See also ==
- Bubble chamber
