= John Adams (physicist) =

English physicist (1920–1984)

Sir John Adams KBE FRS
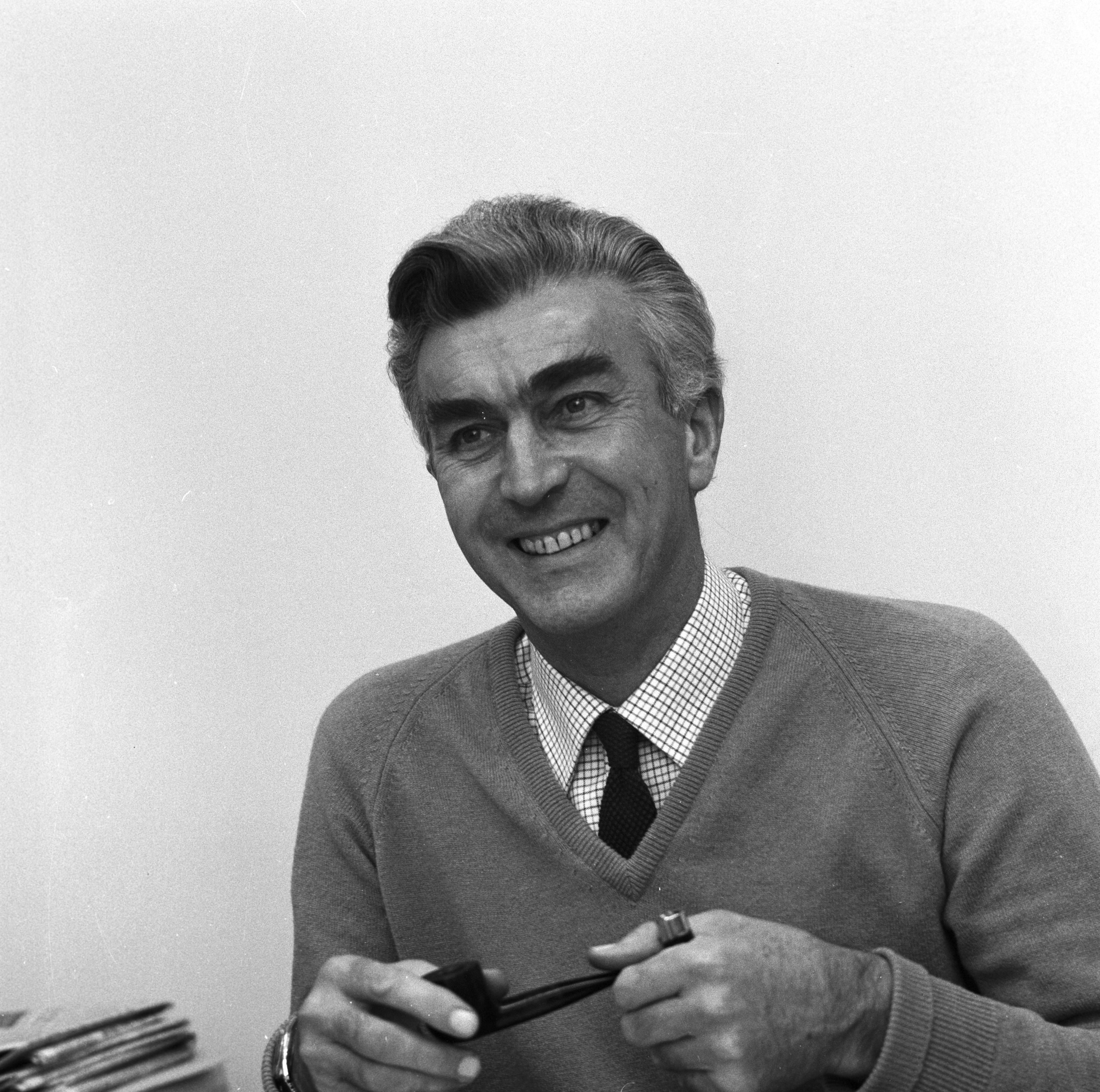
- Adams in 1973
- Born: 24 May 1920; Kingston, Surrey, England
- Died: 3 March 1984 (aged 63); Geneva, Switzerland
- Other name: Sir John Bertram Adams
- Occupations: Physicist and former CERN Director-General
- Spouse: Renie Warburton
- Children: 2

Sir John Bertram Adams KBE FRS (24 May 1920 – 3 March 1984) was an English accelerator physicist and administrator.

Adams is mostly known for his work at CERN and Culham Laboratory. Despite a lack of formal university education, Adams worked for organizations like the Telecommunications Research Establishment and the Atomic Energy Research Establishment in the 1940s and early 1950s. He served as acting director and eventually as elected director of CERN, from 1976 until 1981.

== Biography ==
=== Early life ===
Born in Kingston, Surrey on 24 May 1920. He attended Eltham College from 1931 until 1936, after which he began to work for Siemens Laboratories in Woolwich. He continued studying at the South East London Technical Institute until 1939 earning a Higher National Certificate. Adams received no university education.

=== Professional career ===
At Siemens, his work was concerned with the acoustic properties of telephones. Between 1940 and 1945, he worked the Telecommunications Research Establishment being particularly responsible for developing the microwave radar After, Adams moved to the Atomic Energy Research Establishment until 1953. In 1953, he moved once more to the new CERN Laboratory, serving in the General Physics Division as the engineer in charge of designing and building the Harwell Synchrocyclotron, Europe's first large accelerator which operated successfully for 30 years until shutdown due to lack of funding. Also in late 1953, he was noted serving as a full staff member of the Proton Synchrotron Group. As CERN's proton synchrotron became fully operational in 1959, Adams was important to defining the methods and organization by which physicists would conduct testing. His work organizing CERN's administrative structure and measurement equipment were prepared for experimentation leading up until the synchrotron's start up at the end of 1959. After the death of Cornelis Bakker, CERN Director-General, in April 1960, the Council of CERN appointed Adams to the post of acting Director-General. He held this post until August 1961 when he returned to the UK as director of the Culham Fusion Laboratory, and then from 1966 to 1971 he was a member of the United Kingdom Atomic Energy Authority. He also became a Fellow of the Royal Society. Returning to CERN in 1971 as Director-General of Laboratory II, he led the design of the Super Proton Synchrotron. He split the duties of CERN Director General with Willibald Jentschke and then Léon Van Hove during the 1970s. His careful management of CERN's new projects were important to getting funding and approval from CERN's council. His designs were cautious and focused on reliability while providing the ability for new improvements to be built. The Super Proton Synchrotron was able to reach energies of 540 GeV. With the reorganization of CERN in 1976, he became the executive Director-General, working on obtaining funding for the LEP collider. The new collider used magnet systems for acceleration that were designed by Adams in his previous accelerators.

He was chair of the International Committee for Future Accelerators, a working group of the International Union of Pure and Applied Physics, from 1978 to 1982.

Adams was knighted in 1981.

=== Personal life ===
Adams married Renie Warburton on 24 January 1943. They had two daughters and a son. He resided in Founex (Vaud), Switzerland.

== Awards and honors ==
- Rontegen Prize, University of Giessen (1960)
- D. Sc. (Honorary), University of Geneva
- Duddell Medal, Physical Society (1961)
- D. Sc. (Honorary), University of Birmingham (1961)
- Fellow of Royal Society (1963)
- Leverhulme Medal (Royal Society) (1972)
- Royal Medal, Royal Society (1977)
- Knight Bachelor (1981)

== John Adams Institute for Accelerator Science ==
The John Adams Institute for Accelerator Science (JAI), in the Denys Wilkinson Building, an accelerator physics research institute comprising researchers from Royal Holloway, University of London, University of Oxford and Imperial College London is named in his honour. A main road ("Route Adams") in CERN's Prevessin site is also named after him.

== See also ==
- List of Directors General of CERN

Preceded by Cornelis Bakker	Acting CERN Director General; 03/05/1960–31/07/1961	Succeeded by Victor Weisskopf

Preceded by Bernard Gregory	CERN Director General; 1971–1975 with Willibald Jentschke 1976–1980 with Léon Van Hove	Succeeded by Herwig Schopper

== Notes ==
- CERN Courier, February 1960, page 9, pdf
- CERN Courier, December 1968, page 6, pdf
- CERN Courier, April 1984, page 3, pdf
- List of Directors-General (biographies), John Adams (1920-1984)
- CERN Archives, CERN-ARCH-JBA
