= Willibald Jentschke =

Austrian-German experimental nuclear physicist

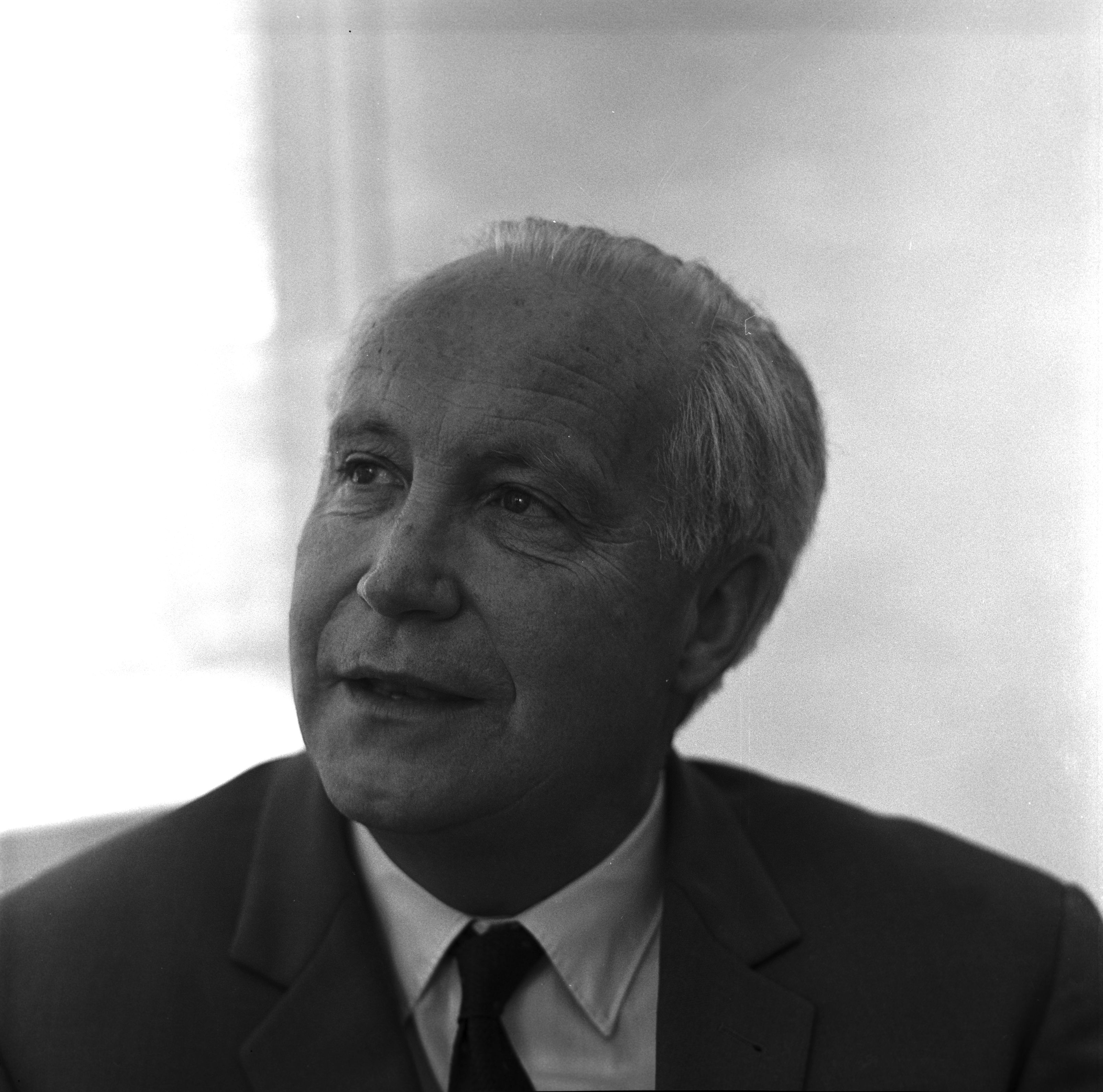
- Jentschke in 1970
- Born: 6 December 1911; Vienna, Austria-Hungary
- Died: 11 March 2002 (aged 90); Göttingen, Germany
- Occupations: Austrian physicist and former CERN Director-General

Willibald Karl Jentschke (6 December 1911 – 11 March 2002) was an Austrian-German experimental nuclear physicist.

During World War II, he made contributions to the German nuclear energy project.

After World War II, he emigrated to the United States to work at Wright-Patterson Air Force Base, in Ohio, for the Air Force Materiel Command. In 1950, he became a professor at the University of Illinois at Urbana–Champaign, where he became director of the Cyclotron Laboratory there in 1951.

In 1956, he became a professor of physics at the University of Hamburg and spearheaded the effort to build the 7.5 GeV electron synchrotron DESY, the foundation of which was in December 1959. He was director of DESY for 10 years. In 1971, he became Director General of CERN Laboratory I for the next five years. He retired from the University of Hamburg in 1980.

== Education ==
Jentschke studied physics at the University of Vienna, from 1930 to 1936. He received his doctorate under Georg Stetter in 1935. Jentschke joined the Nazi Party in 1941.

== Career ==
From 1937 to 1942, Jentschke was a teaching assistant to Georg Stetter at the University of Vienna. From 1942 to 1945, he was a lecturer at the University of Vienna. During World War II, Jentschke was also wissenschaftlich Assistent (Scientific Assistant) at the II. Physikalisches Institut der Universität, Wien (Second Physics Institute of the University of Vienna), where Georg Stetter was the director. One of Jentschke's colleagues there was Josef Schintlmeister. The Institute did research on transuranic elements and measurement of nuclear constants, in collaboration with the Institut für Radiumforschung (Institute for Radium Research) of the Österreichischen Adademie der Wissenschaften (Austrian Academy of Sciences). This work was done under the German nuclear energy project, also known as the Uranverein (Uranium Club); see, for example, the publications cited below under Internal Reports.

In 1939, John Archibald Wheeler and Niels Bohr proposed the liquid-drop model of nuclear fission. Their work suggested that uranium 235 was responsible for thermal neutron fission. This was borne out by the work of Eugene T. Booth, John R. Dunning, A. V. Grosse, and Alfred O. C. Nier, which was submitted for publication in the spring of 1940. Jentschke, F. Prankl, and F. Hernegger also substantiated the Bohr-Wheeler claims shortly after the American work by observing the phenomenon in an isotope of thorium, thorium 230.

From 1946 to 1947, Jentschke was a lecturer at the University of Innsbruck.

Near the close and after the end of World War II in Europe, the Russians and the Western powers had programs to foster technology transfer and exploit German technical specialists. For example, the U.S. had Operation Paperclip and the Russians had trophy brigades advancing with their military forces. In the area of atomic technology, the U.S. had Operation Alsos and the Russians had their version. While operational aspects of the Russian operation were modeled after the trophy brigades, a more refined approach was warranted for the exploitation of German atomic related facilities, intellectual materials, and scientific personnel. This was rectified with a decree in late 1944 and the formation of specialize exploitation teams in early 1945 under the Russian Alsos, which had broader objectives, which included wholesale relocation of scientific facilities to the Soviet Union.

Jentschke emigrated to the United States under Operation Paperclip, where he worked at the Air Force Materiel Command (today, the Air Force Logistics Command after merger with the Air Force Systems Command in 1992), at Wright-Patterson Air Force Base, Ohio, from 1947 to 1948. On his way to the United States, Jentschke wrote to Walther Bothe that his reasons for going there was to do real scientific work, which then not possible in Austria and Germany.

In 1950, Jentschke became a resident assistant professor, and in 1955 resident professor, in the Department of Physics at the University of Illinois at Urbana–Champaign. In 1951, he became director of the Cyclotron Laboratory there.

During 1956 and 1957, Jentschke was a member of the Arbeitskreis Kernphysik (Nuclear Physics Working Group) of the Fachkommission II "Forschung und Nachwuchs" (Commission II "Research and Growth") of the Deutschen Atomkommission (DAtK, German Atomic Energy Commission). Other members of the Nuclear Physics Working Group in both 1956 and 1957 were: Werner Heisenberg (chairman), Hans Kopfermann (vice-chairman), Fritz Bopp, Walther Bothe, Wolfgang Gentner, Otto Haxel, Heinz Maier-Leibnitz, Josef Mattauch, Wolfgang Riezler, Wilhelm Walcher, and Carl Friedrich von Weizsäcker. Wolfgang Paul was also a member of the group during 1957.

In 1956, Jentschke became an ordinarius Professor of Physics at the University of Hamburg. There, he found a positive climate, as well as funding, for his vision of building a new institute around a particle accelerator. An international particle accelerator conference at CERN in 1956 was helpful in the decision of which accelerator to build. His vision could not be supported by Hamburg alone, so negotiations took place to bring in support of the Federal Republic of Germany and the states of Germany (Länder). A financial agreement was signed on 18 December 1959, which founded the Deutsches Elektronen-Synchrotron (DESY), a 7.5 GeV electron synchrotron. Jentschke was chairman of the DESY Board of Directors from 1959 to 1970, and for many years also the director of the Second Institute of Experimental Physics at the University of Hamburg. While at DESY, Jentschke endorsed the electron-positron storage ring scheme for the DORIS accelerator, and promoted the use of synchrotron radiation for research purposes.

In 1971, Jentschke accepted the post as Director General of CERN Laboratory I (the Meyrin site); John Adams was Director General of the neighboring CERN Laboratory II (Prévessin), where the new SPS proton synchrotron was being constructed. They shared the directorship of CERN until the two laboratories were united in 1976. While Director General, Jentschke oversaw the exploitation of the new research tool, the Intersecting Storage Rings, which began operation in 1971.

Jentschke retired from the University of Hamburg in 1980.

== Honors ==
Professor Jentschke was the recipient of a number of honors:

- Wilhelm Exner Medal in 1971.
- Member, Akademie der Wissenschaften und Literatur (In German), Mainz
- Corresponding Member, Österreichische Akademie der Wissenschaften, Vienna
- Honorary Doctor's Degree, University of Illinois
- Honorary Doctor's Degree, RWTH Aachen, 1990
- John T.Tate Award of the American Institute of Physics, 1996

A street, Route Jentschke, on the CERN Meyrin site, is named after him.

== Internal reports ==
The following reports were published in Kernphysikalische Forschungsberichte (Research Reports in Nuclear Physics), an internal publication of the German Uranverein. The reports were classified Top Secret, they had very limited distribution, and the authors were not allowed to keep copies. The reports were confiscated under the Allied Operation Alsos and sent to the United States Atomic Energy Commission for evaluation. In 1971, the reports were declassified and returned to Germany. The reports are available at the Karlsruhe Nuclear Research Center and the American Institute of Physics.

- Willibald Jentschke and F. Prankl Energien und Massen der Urankernbruchstücke (August 1940) G-44.
- Willibald Jentschke Energien und Massen der Urankernbrüchstücke bei Bestrahlung mit schnellen (Rn + Be)-Neutronen (16 September 1941) G-99.

== Selected bibliography ==
- Willibald Jentschke, F. Prankl, and F. Hernegger Die Spaltung des Ioniums under Neutronenebestrahlung, Die Naturwissenschaften Volume 28, Issue 20, 315–316 (1940)
- Willibald Jentschke and Friedlich Prankl Energien und Massen der Urankernbruchstücke bei Bestrahlung mit vorwiegend thermischen Neutronen, Zeitschrift für Physik Volume 119, Numbers 11–12, 696–712 (1942). Received 27 June 1942. Jentschke was identified as being at the II. Physikalisches Institut der Universität Wien, Wien and Prankl was identified as being at the Institut für Radiumforschung, Österreich.
- Willibald Jentschke Energien und Massen der Urankernbruchstücke bei Bestrahlung mit Neutronen, Zeitschrift für Physik Volume 120, Numbers 3–4, 165–184 (1943). Received 18 September 1942. Jentschke was identified as being the II. Physikalisches Institut d. Universität, Wien.

Preceded by Bernard Gregory	CERN Director General; 1971–1975 with John Adams	Succeeded by Léon Van Hove with John Adams
