= Victor Weisskopf =

American theoretical physicist (1908–2002)

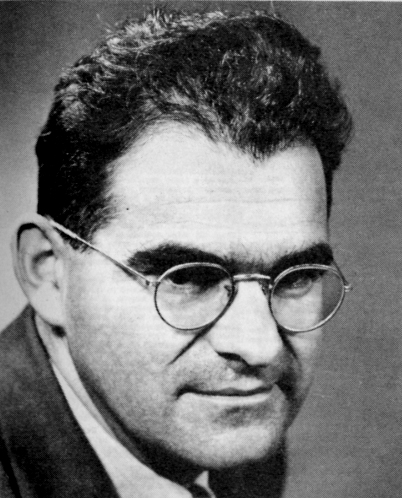
- Weisskopf in the 1940s
- Born: September 19, 1908; Vienna, Austria-Hungary
- Died: April 22, 2002 (aged 93); Newton, Massachusetts, U.S.
- Education: University of Göttingen
- Awards: Max Planck Medal (1956); Oersted Medal (1976); National Medal of Science (1980); Wolf Prize (1981); Enrico Fermi Award (1988); Public Welfare Medal (1991)
- Scientific career
- Fields: Physics
- Workplaces: University of Leipzig; University of Berlin; ETH Zurich; Niels Bohr Institute; University of Rochester; Manhattan Project; MIT; CERN
- Thesis: Zur Theorie der Resonanzfluoreszenz (1931)
- Doctoral advisor: Max Born
- Doctoral students: J. Bruce French; David H. Frisch; Kerson Huang; J. David Jackson; Arthur Kerman; Murray Gell-Mann; Kurt Gottfried; Raymond Stora; Lawrence Biedenharn; George Yevick

Victor Frederick "Viki" Weisskopf (also spelled Viktor; September 19, 1908 – April 22, 2002) was an Austrian-born American theoretical physicist and Director-General of CERN from 1961 – 1965.

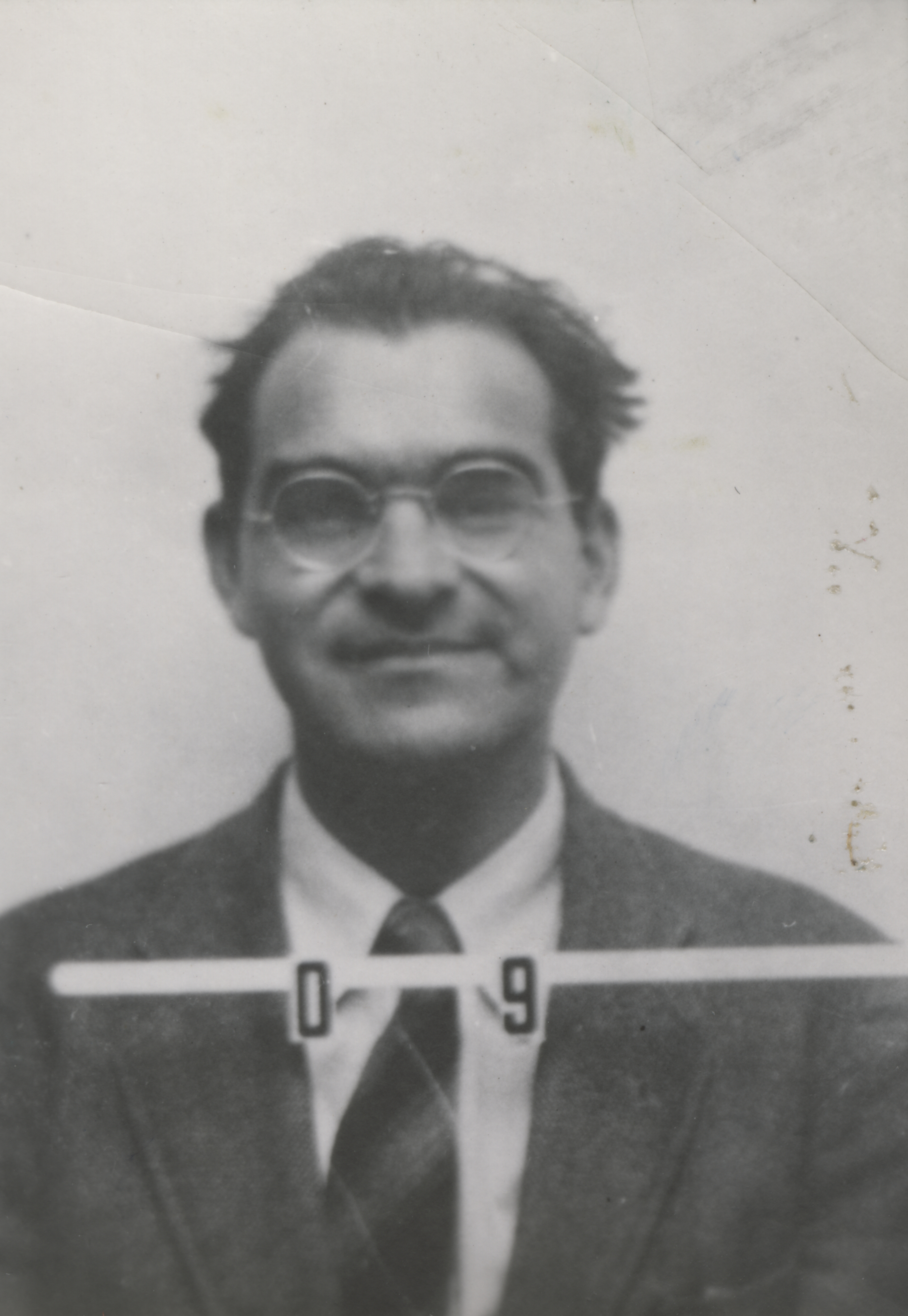
Weisskopf's Los Alamos badge

== Biography ==
Weisskopf was born in Vienna to Jewish parents and earned his doctorate in physics at the University of Göttingen in Germany in 1931. He did postdoctoral work with Werner Heisenberg, Erwin Schrödinger, Wolfgang Pauli, and Niels Bohr. Bohr mentored Weisskopf at his institute in Copenhagen. By the late 1930s, he realized that, as a Jew, he needed to get out of Europe. Bohr helped him find a position at University of Rochester in the United States.

During World War II he was Deputy Division Leader of the Theoretical Division of the Manhattan Project at Los Alamos, and he later campaigned against the proliferation of nuclear weapons.

After World War II, Weisskopf joined the physics faculty at MIT, ultimately becoming head of the department. In 1956, he became one of the founding members of the Physical Science Study Committee (PSSC), developing the curriculum for a revolutionary method of teaching physics at the high school level. As the Red Scare faded, in 1959 Weisskopf joined physicists George Gamow and Hans Bethe in supporting the return of exiled physicist Frank Oppenheimer to science teaching;

At MIT, he encouraged students to ask questions, and even in undergraduate physics courses, taught his students to think like physicists, not just to memorize the equations of physics. He was a memorable teacher, and delighted in posing "Fermi questions" and then helping students to work out approximate answers. For example, he would ask the maximum possible height of a mountain on the Earth, calculated from known basic physical constants. It took him about half an hour to work through an explanation of his computations, with the result being of the same order of magnitude as the known height of Mount Everest. For an encore, he would quickly work out the analogous answers for Mars and Jupiter (when the Mars Orbiter survey results later became available, they were consistent with his computed elevation). For his finale, he would compute the energy released by rolling a bowling ball down the highest theoretical mountain on Jupiter.

His first wife, Ellen Tvede, died in 1989. Weisskopf died on April 22, 2002, and was survived by his second wife Duscha, daughter of accidental Night of the Long Knives victim Willi Schmid.

== Scientific achievements ==
In the 1930s and 1940s, "Viki", as everyone called him, made major contributions to the development of quantum theory, especially in the area of quantum electrodynamics. One of his few regrets was that his insecurity about his mathematical abilities may have cost him a Nobel Prize when he did not publish results (which turned out to be correct) about what became known as the Lamb shift. Nevertheless, he was nominated for the Nobel Prize in Physics numerous times later in his career.

From 1937 to 1943 he was a Professor of Physics at the University of Rochester. There, he met graduate student Esther Conwell, and together they formulated the Conwell–Weisskopf theory, which describes the movement of electrons through semiconductors and led to a better understanding of integrated circuits, knowledge that became essential for modern computing. Weisskopf was a co-founder and board member of the Union of Concerned Scientists. He served as director-general of CERN from 1961 to 1966 In 1966 a Festschrift was published in his honor.

Weisskopf was awarded the Max Planck Medal in 1956 and the Prix mondial Cino Del Duca in 1972, the National Medal of Science (1980), the Wolf Prize (1981) and the Public Welfare Medal from the National Academy of Sciences (1991).

Weisskopf was a co-founder and board member of the Union of Concerned Scientists. Weisskopf was a member of the National Academy of Sciences and the American Philosophical Society. He was president of the American Physical Society (1960–61) and the American Academy of Arts and Sciences (1976–1979). He was appointed by Pope Paul VI to the 70-member Pontifical Academy of Sciences in 1975, and in 1981 he led a team of four scientists sent by Pope John Paul II to talk to President Ronald Reagan about the need to prohibit the use of nuclear weapons.

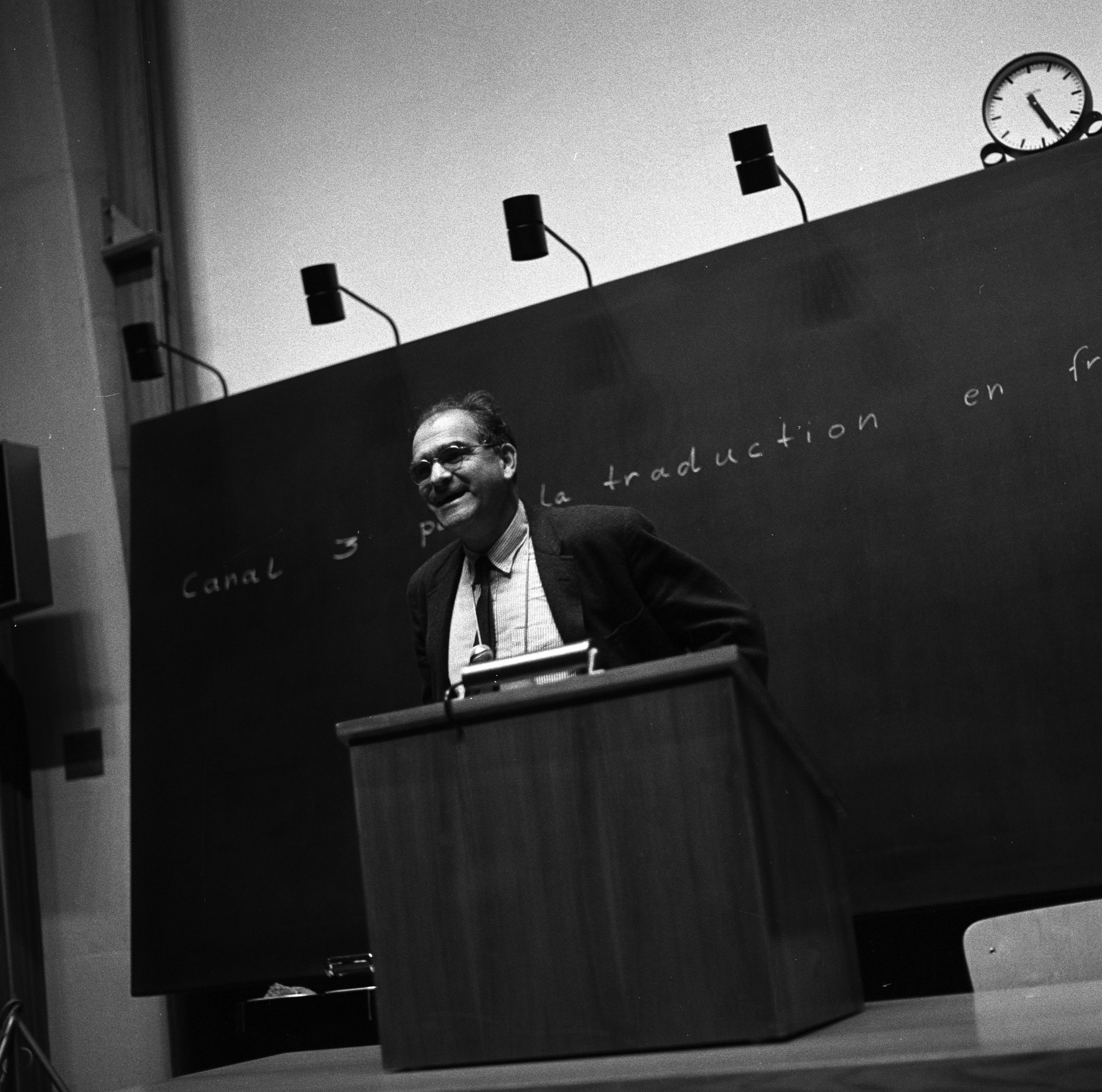
Victor Weisskopf at CERN in 1964

== Decorations and awards ==
- 1956: Max Planck Medal
- 1971: First recipient of the George Gamow Memorial Lectureship Award from the University of Colorado Boulder
- 1972: Prix mondial Cino Del Duca
- 1976: Oersted Medal
- 1977: Marian Smoluchowski Medal
- 1978: Pour le Mérite for Arts and Sciences
- 1980: National Medal of Science
- 1981: Wolf Prize
- 1982: Austrian Decoration for Science and Art
- 1983: J. Robert Oppenheimer Memorial Prize
- 1984: Albert Einstein Medal
- 1990: Ludwig Wittgenstein Prize of the Austrian Science Fund
- 1991: Public Welfare Medal (United States National Academy of Sciences)
- 2000: Grand Gold Medal with Star for Services to the Republic of Austria

There is a street, Route Weisskopf, named after Weisskopf at CERN, Geneva, Switzerland.

== Quotes ==
Human existence is based upon two pillars: Compassion and knowledge. Compassion without knowledge is ineffective; knowledge without compassion is inhuman.

Citing initial teacher–student interactions, Noam Chomsky attributes to Victor the educational maxim,

It doesn't matter what we cover. It matters what we discover.

There are no stupid questions, Said by Weisskopf in person to G. Miller and other graduate students at a seminar

== Publications ==
- Weisskopf, Victor; Blatt, J. M. Theoretical Nuclear Physics (1952). New York: John Wiley. ISBN 9781258687984.
- Weisskopf, Victor. Knowledge and Wonder: The Natural World as Man Knows It (1963). New York: Anchor Books/Doubleday & Co. (Science Study Series S31). ISBN 9780262730525.
- Weisskopf, Victor (1970). Modern Physics from an Elementary Point of View. Geneva: CERN.
- Weisskopf, Victor (1972). Physics in the Twentieth Century: Selected Essays. Cambridge, Massachusetts: MIT Press. ISBN 9780262730303.
- Weisskopf, Victor; Kurt Gottfried (1984). Concepts of Particle Physics, vol. 1. New York: Oxford University Press. Bibcode:1984copl.conf.....G.
- Weisskopf, Victor; Kurt Gottfried (1986). Concepts of Particle Physics, vol. 2. New York: Oxford University Press. ISBN 9780195033939.
- Weisskopf, Victor F. (August 1, 1969). "The privilege of being a physicist". Physics Today. 22 (8): 39–43. doi:10.1063/1.3035736. ISSN 0031-9228.
- Weisskopf, Victor (1991). The Joy of Insight: Passions of a Physicist. New York: Basic Books. ISBN 978-0-465-03678-3.

== Bibliography ==
- Medawar, Jean; Pyke, David (2012). Hitler's Gift: The True Story of the Scientists Expelled by the Nazi Regime (Paperback). New York: Arcade Publishing. ISBN 978-1-61145-709-4.
- V. Stefan, ed. (1998). Physics and Society: Essays in Honor of Victor Frederick Weisskopf by the International Community of Physicists. AIP Press. ISBN 1-56396-386-8.

Preceded by John Adams (Acting Director-General)	CERN Director General; 1961–1965	Succeeded by Bernard Gregory
