= List of directors general of CERN =

Director-General of CERN
- Directeur général or Directrice générale
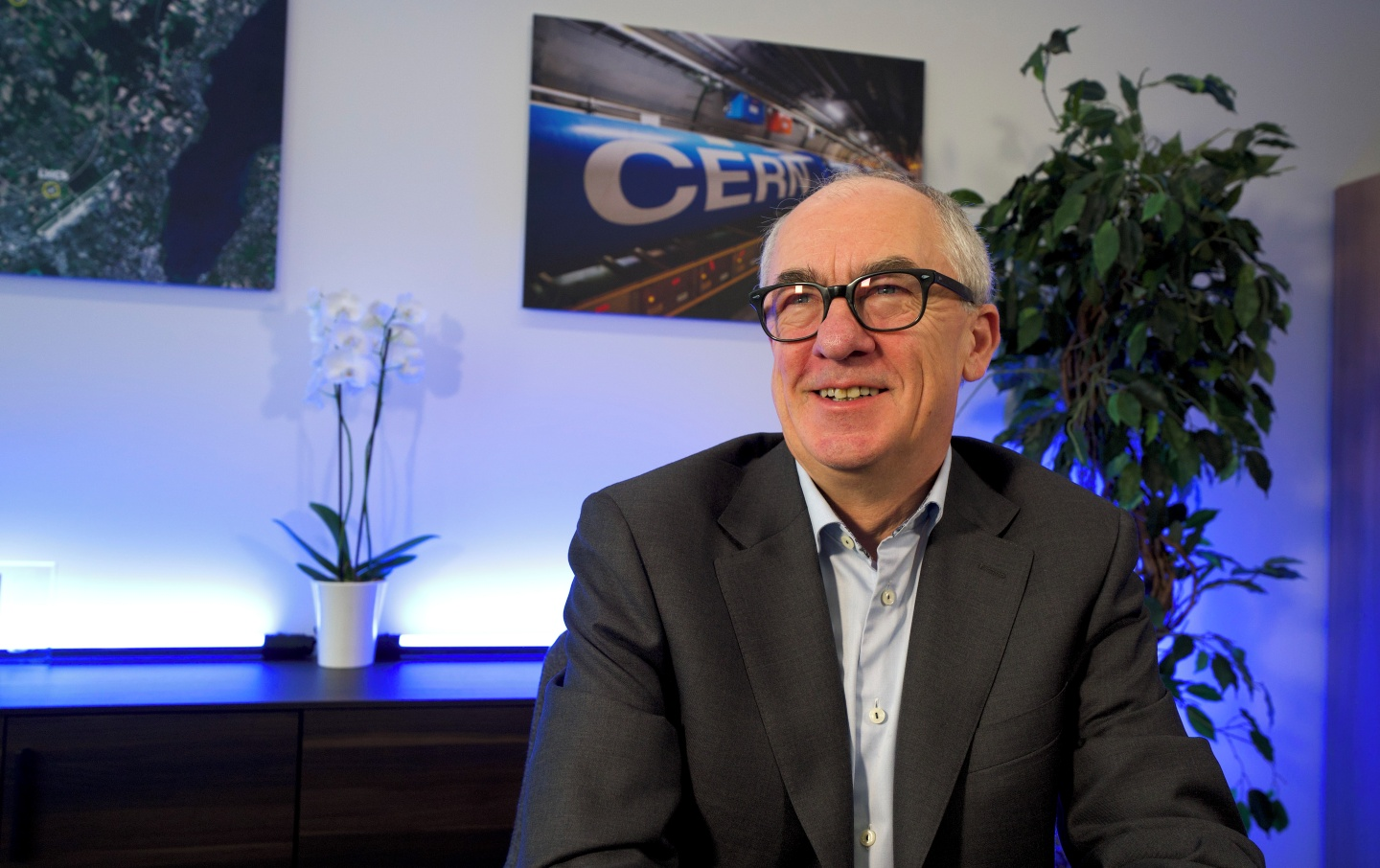
- Incumbent; Mark Thomson since 1 January 2026
- Abbreviation: DG
- Reports to: CERN Council
- Appointer: CERN Council
- Term length: 5 years typical length
- Precursor: Secretary-General
- Formation: October 1954
- First holder: Felix Bloch

CERN directors general typically serve 5 year terms beginning on January 1.

== List ==
| In office | Directors General | Country |
|---|---|---|
| 1952–1954 | Edoardo Amaldi (Secretary-General) | Italy |
| 1954–1955 | Felix Bloch | Switzerland |
| 1955–1960 | Cornelis Bakker | Netherlands |
| 1960–1961 | John Adams (acting director) | United Kingdom |
| 1961–1965 | Victor Frederick Weisskopf | United States |
| 1966–1970 | Bernard Gregory | France |
| 1971–1975 | Willibald Jentschke (co-directors) | Austria |
| 1971–1975 | John Adams (co-directors) | United Kingdom |
| 1976–1980 | Léon Van Hove (co-directors) | Belgium |
| 1976–1980 | John Adams (co-directors) | United Kingdom |
| 1981–1988 | Herwig Schopper | Germany |
| 1989–1993 | Carlo Rubbia | Italy |
| 1994–1998 | Christopher Llewellyn Smith | United Kingdom |
| 1999–2003 | Luciano Maiani | Italy |
| 2004–2008 | Robert Aymar | France |
| 2009–2015 | Rolf-Dieter Heuer | Germany |
| 2016–2025 | Fabiola Gianotti | Italy |
| 2026– | Mark Thomson | United Kingdom |
