= Aaldert Wapstra =

Dutch physicist (1922–2006)

Aaldert Hendrik Wapstra
- Born: 24 April 1922
- Died: 2 December 2006 (aged 84); Naarden
- Known for: work on the Atomic Mass Evaluation
- Awards: SUNAMCO medal, 2004
- Scientific career
- Fields: Physics

Aaldert Hendrik Wapstra (24 April 1922 in Utrecht – 2 December 2006 in Naarden) was a Dutch physicist renowned for his work on the Atomic Mass Evaluation. He worked on the Atomic Mass Evaluation originally with Josef Mattauch at the Max Planck Institute for Chemistry and later on with his colleague Georges Audi at Université de Paris-Sud. For this work he obtained the SUNAMCO medal of the International Union of Pure and Applied Physics (IUPAP) in September 2004.

Wapstra studied physics at Utrecht University and obtained his PhD with the dissertation Decay schemes of Pb209, Bi207 and Bi214 and the binding energies of the heavy nuclei at the University of Amsterdam in 1953. He became a full professor in 1955 at the department of experimental physics at the Technische Hogeschool, now the Technical University in Delft, Netherlands. On 18 March 1963 Wapstra entered the board of the IKO, now known as NIKHEF, as the scientific director of nuclear spectroscopy. He became the director in 1971, succeeding Van Lieshout, where he continued on until 1982. He retired in 1987.

== Publications ==
- Wapstra, Aaldert H. (1955). "Isotopic Masses I. A < 34". Physica. 21 (6–10): 367. Bibcode:1955Phy....21..796W. doi:10.1016/S0031-8914(55)92065-6.
- Wapstra, Aaldert H. (1955). "Isotopic Masses II. 33 < A < 202". Physica. 21 (6–10): 385. Bibcode:1955Phy....21..796W. doi:10.1016/S0031-8914(55)92065-6.
- Everling, Friedrich; König, L. A.; Mattauch, Josef H. E.; Wapstra, Aaldert H.; Relative Nuclidic Masses, Nuclear Physics, 18, 529 (1960)
- Wapstra, Aaldert Hendrik; Bos, K. (1977). "The 1977 atomic mass evaluation : in four parts". Atomic Data and Nuclear Data Tables. 19 (3): 175. Bibcode:1977ADNDT..19..175W. doi:10.1016/0092-640X(77)90019-5.
- Audi, Georges; Wapstra, Aaldert Hendrik (1995). "The 1995 Update to the Atomic Mass Evaluation". Nuclear Physics A. 595 (4): 409. Bibcode:1995NuPhA.595..409A. doi:10.1016/0375-9474(95)00445-9.
- Audi, Georges; Bersillon, Olivier; Blachot, Jean; Wapstra, Aaldert Hendrik (1997). "The NUBASE evaluation of nuclear and decay properties" (PDF). Nuclear Physics A. 624 (1): 1–124. Bibcode:1997NuPhA.624....1A. doi:10.1016/S0375-9474(97)00482-X. Archived from the original (PDF) on 2008-09-23.
- Wapstra, Aaldert Hendrik; Audi, Georges; Thibault, Catherine (2003). "The AME2003 atomic mass evaluation (I). Evaluation of input data, adjustment procedures" (PDF). Nuclear Physics A. 729 (1): 129. Bibcode:2003NuPhA.729..129W. doi:10.1016/j.nuclphysa.2003.11.002.
- Audi, Georges; Wapstra, Aaldert Hendrik; Thibault, Catherine (2003). "The AME2003 atomic mass evaluation (II). Tables, graphs, and references". Nuclear Physics A. 729 (1): 337. Bibcode:2003NuPhA.729..337A. doi:10.1016/j.nuclphysa.2003.11.003.
- Audi, Georges; Wang, Meng; Wapstra, Aaldert H.; Kondev, Filip G.; MacCormick, Marion; Xu, Xing; and Pfeiffer, Bernd; The AME2012 atomic mass evaluation (I). Evaluation of input data, adjustment procedures, Chinese Physics C36, 1287 (2012)
- Wang, Meng; Audi, Georges; Wapstra, Aaldert H.; Kondev, Filip G.; MacCormick, Marion; Xu, Xing; and Pfeiffer, Bernd; The AME2012 atomic mass evaluation (II). Tables, graphs and references, Chinese Physics C36, 1603 (2012)
