= Felix Bloch =

Swiss-American physicist (1905–1983)

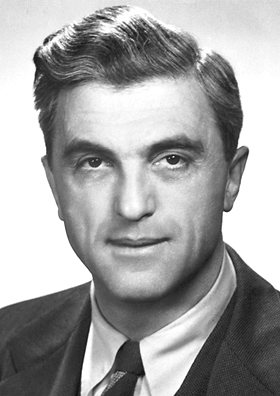
- Bloch in 1952

1st Director-General of CERN
- In office 1954–1955
- Preceded by: Office established
- Succeeded by: Cornelis Bakker

Personal details
- Born: 23 October 1905 Zurich, Switzerland
- Died: 10 September 1983 (aged 77) Zurich, Switzerland
- Citizenship: Switzerland; United States (from 1939)
- Scientific career
- Education: ETH Zurich; University of Leipzig (Dr. phil.)
- Known for: Bloch's theorem (1929); Bloch equations (1946)
- Spouse: Lore Misch (m. 1940)
- Children: 4
- Awards: Membership of NAS (1948); Nobel Prize in Physics (1952)
- Fields: Condensed matter physics; Magnetism
- Workplaces: Stanford University
- Thesis: Über die Quantenmechanik der Elektronen in Kristallgittern (1929)
- Doctoral advisor: Werner Heisenberg
- Doctoral students: Carson D. Jeffries (1951); Michael Schick (1967)

Felix Bloch (23 October 1905 – 10 September 1983) was a Swiss–American theoretical physicist who shared the 1952 Nobel Prize in Physics with Edward Mills Purcell "for their development of new methods for nuclear magnetic precision measurements and discoveries in connection therewith."

He was the first Stanford University Nobel laureate.

Bloch made fundamental theoretical contributions to the understanding of ferromagnetism and electron behavior in crystal lattices. He is also considered one of the developers of nuclear magnetic resonance.

== Education ==
Felix Bloch was born on 23 October 1905 in Zurich, Switzerland, to Jewish parents, Gustav Bloch and Agnes Mayer. Gustav was financially unable to attend university and worked as a wholesale grain dealer in Zurich. Gustav moved to Zurich from Moravia in 1890 to become a Swiss citizen. Their first child was a girl born in 1902, while Felix was born three years later.

Bloch entered public elementary school at the age of six and is said to have been teased, in part because he "spoke Swiss German with a somewhat different accent than most members of the class". He received support from his older sister during much of this time, but she died at the age of 12, devastating Felix, who is said to have lived a "depressed and isolated life" in the following years. Bloch learned to play the piano by the age of 8 and was drawn to arithmetic for its "clarity and beauty". Bloch graduated from elementary school at twelve and enrolled in the Cantonal Gymnasium in Zurich for secondary school in 1918. He was placed on a six-year curriculum here to prepare him for university. He continued his curriculum through 1924, even through his study of engineering and physics in other schools, though it was limited to mathematics and languages after the first three years.

After these first three years at the Gymnasium, at the age of 15, Bloch began to study at the ETH Zurich. Although he initially studied engineering, he soon changed to physics. During this time, he attended lectures and seminars given by Peter Debye and Hermann Weyl at the ETH Zurich and Erwin Schrödinger at the neighboring University of Zurich. A fellow student in these seminars was John von Neumann.

Bloch graduated in 1927, and was encouraged by Debye to go to the University of Leipzig to study under Werner Heisenberg. Bloch became Heisenberg's first graduate student, and gained his PhD in 1928. His thesis established the quantum theory of solids, using waves to describe electrons in periodic lattices.

== Career and research ==
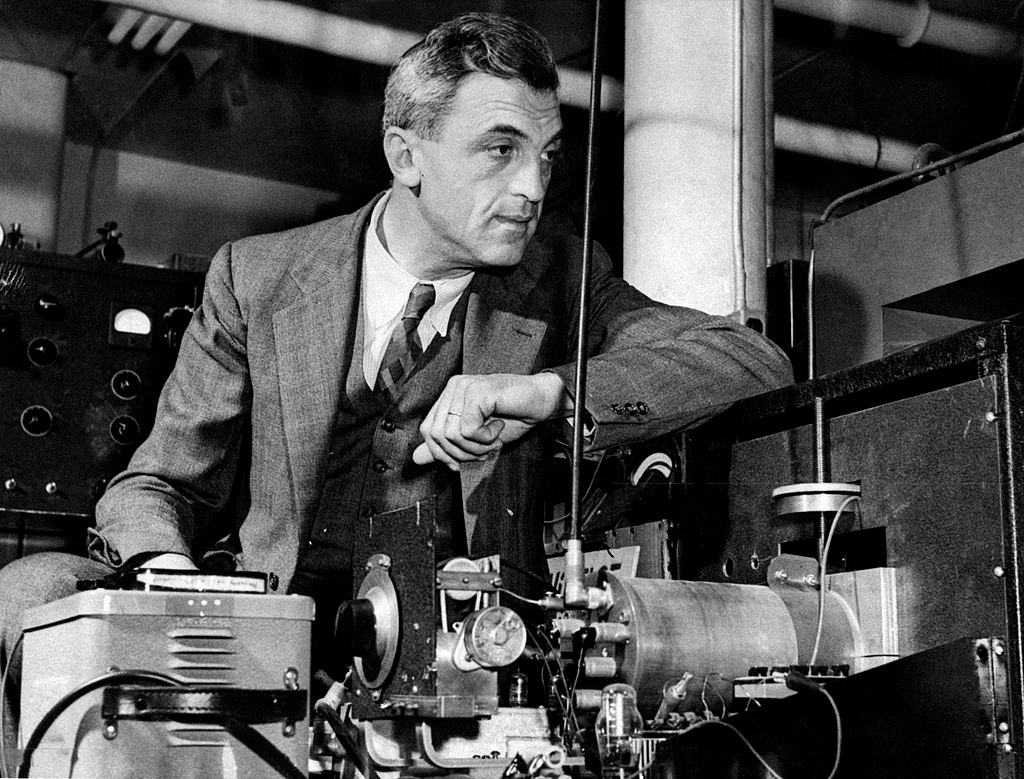
Felix Bloch in the lab, 1950s

Bloch remained in European academia, working on superconductivity with Wolfgang Pauli in Zurich; with Hans Kramers and Adriaan Fokker in the Netherlands; with Heisenberg on ferromagnetism, where he developed a description of boundaries between magnetic domains, now known as Bloch walls, and theoretically proposed a concept of spin waves, excitations of magnetic structure; with Niels Bohr in Copenhagen, where he worked on a theoretical description of the stopping of charged particles traveling through matter; and with Enrico Fermi in Rome.

In 1932, Bloch returned to Leipzig to assume a position as Privatdozent (lecturer). In 1933, immediately after Adolf Hitler came to power, Bloch left Germany out of fear of anti-Jewish persecution, returning to Zurich before traveling to Paris to lecture at the Institut Henri Poincaré.

In 1934, the chairman of the Physics Department of Stanford University invited Bloch to join the faculty. Bloch accepted the offer and emigrated to the United States. In the fall of 1938, Bloch began working with the 37 inch cyclotron at the University of California, Berkeley, to determine the magnetic moment of the neutron. Bloch went on to become the first professor of theoretical physics at Stanford. He became a naturalized U.S. citizen in 1939.

During World War II, Bloch briefly worked on the atomic bomb project at Los Alamos. Disliking the military atmosphere of the laboratory and uninterested in the theoretical work there, Bloch left to join the radar project at Harvard University.

After the war, Bloch concentrated on investigations into nuclear induction and nuclear magnetic resonance, which are the underlying principles of MRI. In 1946, he proposed the Bloch equations, which determine the time evolution of nuclear magnetization. Along with Edward Purcell, Bloch was awarded the Nobel Prize in Physics in 1952 for his work on nuclear magnetic induction.

When CERN was being set up in the early 1950s, its founders were searching for someone of stature and international prestige to head the fledgling international laboratory, and in 1954 Professor Bloch became CERN's first director-general, at the time when construction was getting under way on the present Meyrin site and plans for the first machines were being drawn up. After leaving CERN, Bloch returned to Stanford University, where in 1961 he was made Max Stein Professor of Physics. He retired from Stanford in 1971.

== Family ==
On 14 March 1940, Bloch married Lore Clara Misch (1911–1996), a fellow physicist working on X-ray crystallography, whom he had met at an American Physical Society meeting. They had four children, twins George Jacob Bloch and Daniel Arthur Bloch (born 15 January 1941), son Frank Samuel Bloch (born 16 January 1945), and daughter Ruth Hedy Bloch (born 15 September 1949).

Bloch died on 10 September 1983 in Zurich at the age of 77. In 2025, Bloch's family donated his Nobel Prize medal to CERN.

== Recognition ==
=== Memberships ===
Year	Organization	Type	Ref.
1948	(United States) National Academy of Sciences	Member	
1957	(United States) American Academy of Arts and Sciences	Member	
1964	Royal Netherlands Academy of Arts and Sciences	Foreign Member	
1965	(United States) American Philosophical Society	Member	

=== Awards ===
Year	Organization	Award	Citation	Ref.
1952	(Sweden) Royal Swedish Academy of Sciences	Nobel Prize in Physics (Note: Shared with Edward Mills Purcell.)	"For their development of new methods for nuclear magnetic precision measurements and discoveries in connection therewith."	

== See also ==
- List of Jewish Nobel laureates
- List of things named after Felix Bloch

== Notes ==
Academic offices
Preceded by Position created	First Director-General of CERN; 1954-1955	Succeeded by Cornelis Bakker
Preceded by Robert Bacher	President of the American Physical Society; 1965	Succeeded by John Archibald Wheeler
