= Collective effects (accelerator physics) =

Charged particle beams in a particle accelerator or a storage ring undergo a variety of different processes. Typically the beam dynamics is broken down into single particle dynamics and collective effects. Sources of collective effects include single or multiple inter-particle scattering and interaction with the vacuum chamber and other surroundings, formalized in terms of impedance.

The collective effects of charged particle beams in particle accelerators share some similarity to the dynamics of plasmas. In particular, a charged particle beam may be considered as a non-neutral plasma, and one may find mathematical methods in common with the study of stability or instabilities. One may also find commonality with the field of fluid mechanics since the density of charged particles is often sufficient to be considered as flowing continuum.

Another important topic is the attempt to mitigate collective effects by use of single bunch or multi-bunch feedback systems.

== Types of collective effects ==
Collective effects can include emittance growth, bunch length or energy spread growth, instabilities, or particle losses. There are also multi-bunch effects.

== Formalisms for treating collective effects ==
The collective beam motion may be modeled in a variety of ways. One may use macroparticle models, or else a continuum model. The evolution equation in the latter case is typically called the Vlasov equation, and requires one to write down the Hamiltonian function including the external magnetic fields, and the self interaction. Stochastic effects may be added by generalizing to the Fokker–Planck equation.

== Software for computation of collective effects ==
Depending on the effects considered and the modeling formalism used, different software is available for simulation. The collective effects must typically be added in addition to the single particle dynamics, which may be modeled using a tracking code. See article on Accelerator physics codes.
