= Strange particle =

Elementary particle

A strange particle is an elementary particle with a strangeness quantum number different from zero. Strange particles are members of a large family of elementary particles carrying the quantum number of strangeness, including several cases where the quantum number is hidden in a strange/anti-strange pair, for example in the Φ meson. The classification of particles, as mesons and baryons, follows the quark/anti-quark and three quark content respectively. Murray Gell-Mann recognized the group structure of elementary particle classification introducing the flavour SU(3) and strangeness as a new quantum number.

Strange particles are a class of subatomic particles (specifically hadrons) that contain at least one strange quark or anti-strange quark. They were first observed in cosmic ray experiments in the late 1940s. They were initially termed "strange" because they exhibited an anomalous discrepancy between their rapid creation rate via the strong interaction and their unexpectedly long lifetimes, which are governed by the weak interaction.

The study of strange particles led to the introduction of the strangeness quantum number, the development of the Eightfold Way classification system, and the ultimate formulation of the quark model.

== Discovery and the production paradox ==
In 1947, physicists George Rochester and Clifford Charles Butler observed novel V-shaped tracks in a cloud chamber exposed to cosmic radiation. These tracks indicated the presence of previously unknown neutral particles decaying into charged pairs. By the early 1950s, similar particles were routinely generated in particle accelerator experiments.

These particles presented a physical paradox regarding their lifespans:

- Associated production: Strange particles were never produced in isolation during high-energy collisions. They were always created in pairs (such as a kaon alongside a lambda baryon). This rapid generation occurred via the strong interaction on a timescale of approximately $10^{-23}$ seconds.
- Suppressed decay: Once separated, individual strange particles did not decay rapidly back into ordinary hadrons via the strong interaction. Instead, they survived for $10^{-10}$ to $10^{-8}$ seconds. In quantum mechanics, a lifespan of this duration is characteristic of the weaker and slower weak interaction.

== The strangeness quantum number ==
In 1953, Murray Gell-Mann and Kazuhiko Nishijima independently resolved this paradox by proposing a new, conserved quantum number termed strangeness ($S$). They formulated the Gell-Mann–Nishijima formula, which relates a hadron's electric charge ($Q$), the third component of isospin ($I_3$), baryon number ($B$), and strangeness ($S$):

$$Q = I_3 + \frac{B + S}{2}$$

Under this framework, ordinary nucleons (protons and neutrons) possess a strangeness value of $S = 0$. The interactions of strange particles are dictated by two primary conservation rules:

1. Strangeness conservation: The strong and electromagnetic interactions strictly conserve the net strangeness of a system. Consequently, a strong collision starting with ordinary matter ($S=0$) must produce a pair of particles whose individual strangeness values cancel each other out (e.g., one particle with $S = +1$ and another with $S = -1$).
2. Strangeness violation: The weak interaction does not conserve strangeness and can alter the quantum number by $\Delta S = \pm 1$. Because an isolated strange particle cannot decay into ordinary particles via the strong force without violating strangeness conservation, it is forced to decay via the slower weak interaction, explaining its prolonged lifetime.

== Classification ==
Strange particles are classified into two primary hadron groups based on their baryon number:

=== Strange mesons (Kaons) ===
Kaons ($K$-mesons) have a baryon number of $B = 0$. The group includes:

- $K^+$ and $K^0$, which carry a strangeness value of $S = +1$.
- $K^-$ and $\bar{K}^0$ (their respective antiparticles), which carry a strangeness value of $S = -1$.

=== Strange baryons (Hyperons) ===
Baryons with non-zero strangeness are classified as hyperons and possess a baryon number of $B = 1$. Key examples include:

- Lambda baryon ($\Lambda^0$): A neutral hyperon with $S = -1$.
- Sigma baryon ($\Sigma^+, \Sigma^0, \Sigma^-$): A triplet of charged states, all possessing $S = -1$.
- Xi baryon ($\Xi^0, \Xi^-$): Also known as cascade particles, possessing $S = -2$.
- Omega baryon ($\Omega^-$): A heavy baryon possessing $S = -3$.

== Role in the quark model ==
Quark Composition of Common Strange Particles
| Particle | Symbol | Quark Content | Strangeness ($S$) |
|---|---|---|---|
| Positive Kaon | $K^+$ | $u\bar{s}$ | +1 |
| Lambda | $\Lambda^0$ | $uds$ | -1 |
| Negative Xi | $\Xi^-$ | $dss$ | -2 |
| Omega-minus | $\Omega^-$ | $sss$ | -3 |

In 1961, Gell-Mann and Yuval Ne'eman utilized strangeness and isospin to organize the known hadrons into geometric patterns under the SU(3) flavor symmetry group, a framework Gell-Mann called the "Eightfold Way."

The predictive power of this classification scheme was demonstrated when the baryon decuplet (a ten-particle triangular matrix) exhibited an empty slot at its apex. The model predicted a particle must exist there with a mass of roughly 1672 MeV/c² and a strangeness of $S = -3$. The subsequent discovery of the $\Omega^-$ baryon at Brookhaven National Laboratory in 1964 confirmed the physical validity of the SU(3) symmetry.

This mathematical symmetry led directly to the 1964 introduction of the quark model by Gell-Mann and George Zweig. In the modern Standard Model, the "strangeness" of a particle corresponds directly to its internal content of strange quarks ($s$, which carries $S = -1$) or anti-strange quarks ($\bar{s}$, which carries $S = +1$). When a strange particle decays weakly, a W boson mediates the flavor-changing transformation of a strange quark into an up quark ($u$), reducing the absolute value of the system's strangeness quantum number.

== See also ==
- Strangeness
- Strange quark
- Quark model
- Hyperon
- Kaon
- Eightfold Way (physics)
