= Juliet Lee-Franzini =

American physicist

- Born: May 18, 1933; Paris, France
- Died: January 19, 2015 (aged 81)
- Other name: Juliet Lee
- Citizenship: American
- Education: Hunter College; Columbia University
- Spouse: Paolo Franzini
- Children: Paula Franzini
- Scientific career
- Workplaces: Stony Brook University; Cornell University; Laboratori Nazionali di Frascati; State University of New York
- Thesis: Search for the decay mode μ → e+ γ (1960)
- Doctoral advisor: Jack Steinberger
- Doctoral students: Meenakshi Narain; Michael Tuts

Juliet Lee-Franzini (1933 – 2014) was a doctor and researcher in particle physics who founded the high energy physics experimental group at Stony Brook University.

== Early life and education ==
Juliet Lee was born of Chinese parents in Paris, France on May 18, 1933 and lived her early days on a French farm.

In 1937, at the start of the second Sino-Japanese war, her father was summoned to a diplomatic posting in Hanoi, Vietnam. Her family stayed in Hanoi until 1940, when they moved to Chonqing, China. Juliet attended school sporadically and learned the local Chinese tongue.

In 1947, Juliet and her parents moved to New York, where she attended public school and completed the liberal arts curriculum. She also danced ballet and tutored local students in algebra.

After her father acquired a restaurant near Columbia University, Juliet started to drop in on graduate physics classes, which furthered her interest in mathematics.

She earned her BA at Hunter College in 1953, her MA and PhD from Columbia University in 1957 and 1960. During her education at Columbia, Juliet became interested in the parity violation research.

== Career ==
Lee-Franzini first worked as a multilingual guide at the United Nations, then as a cook and waitress at the restaurant at her father's restaurant.

From 1960 to 1962, Juliet worked as a research associate at Nevis Laboratories, at Columbia University. From 1962 to 1963, she became a fellow on the National Academy of Science-National Research Council. In 1963, worked as a professor of physics at Stony Brook and played a leading role in making the lab known for particle physics.

During her Stony Brook tenure, Juliet also served as visiting professor of physics at Cornell University from 1980 to 1981.

In 1991, she took the position of VIP physicist at the Laboratori Nazionali di Frascati dell’INFN until 1996, when she became the director of research. There, she worked on the KLOE research project, which relied on the DAFNE electron-positron collider to research the matter-antimatter imbalance.

== Professional board memberships ==
Lee-Franzini served on the Board of Directors of The Research Foundation of the State University of New York, from 1986 to 1991. She was on the executive committee of the Division of Particles and Fields at the American Physical Society from 1987 to 1989. From 1989 to 1991, she was on the nominating committee of the American Physical Society and served on the nominating committee of the Division of Particles and Fields.

== Research ==
Lee-Franzini conducted research at many laboratories over her lifetime. Her experiments in particle physics were conducted at Nevis Labs, Brookhaven National Laboratory, Penn-Princeton Accelerator, Fermilab, Cornell, and Frascati.

Her early experiments at Columbia investigated the quantities of muon decay spectra and revealed accurate confirmation of the V-A nature of the weak interactive force. She also studied the spectroscopy of bound state mesons, quark heavy flavor potentials, and the KLOE experiments at Frascati.

Lee-Franzini and her team used the IBM 7090 at Columbia University to discover the violation of charge-conjugation invariance in interactions of intermediate strength in 1964.

=== Published works ===
- Hidden and Open Beauty in CUSB
- CP and CPT Studies with Kaons
- Measurement of σ(e^{+}e^{−} → π^{+}π^{−}) at e^{+}e^{−} colliders
- CP Violation in the K-System (1997)

Lee-Franzini was also cited as a collaborator in 32 other research papers.

== Honors ==
Juliet Lee-Franzini was recognized as a Fellow of the American Physical Society in 1984.

== Personal life ==
In 1964, Juliet married fellow physicist Paolo Franzini and took the name Lee-Franzini. They continued to collaborate together professionally throughout their careers.

Juliet gave birth to her daughter Paula in 1965 in New York. Paula became a physicist, earned a PhD from Stanford in 1987, and published over 30 papers. She changed paths in the 2000s and became a printmaker and painter. She studied visual arts at Ar.Co (Centro de Arte e Comunicação Visual) in Lisbon, Portugal and the Saidye Bronfman Center for the Arts in Montreal, Canada.

Paula dedicated an art exhibition named Fil de Pensée to her mother in 2017.
