= Monochromatization =

Monochromatization in the context of accelerator physics is a theoretical principle used to increase center-of-mass energy resolution in high-luminosity particle collisions. The decrease of the collision energy spread can be accomplished without reducing the inherent energy spread of either of the two colliding beams, introducing opposite correlations between spatial position and energy at the interaction point (IP). In beam-optical terms, this can be accomplished through a non-zero dispersion function for both beams of opposite sign at the IP. The dispersion is determined by the respective lattice.

== History ==
Monochromatization is a technique which has been proposed since a long time for reducing the centre-of-mass energy spread at e^{−}e^{+} colliders, but this has never been used in any operational collider. This technique was first proposed by 1975 by A. Renieri to improve energy resolution of Italian collider Adone.

Implementation of a monochromatization scheme has been explored for several past colliders such as

- ADONE (National Institute of Nuclear Physics)
- SPEAR (SLAC National Accelerator Laboratory)
- LEP (CERN)

but until now such a scheme has never been applied, or tested, in any operating collider. Nevertheless, studies for the FCC-ee are under development.
