= Mass formula =

Mass formula may refer to:

- Gell-Mann–Okubo mass formula, a formula for the mass of hadrons in quantum chromodynamics
- Smith–Minkowski–Siegel mass formula, a formula about automorphism groups of quadratic forms
