= Kazuhiko Nishijima =

Japanese physicist

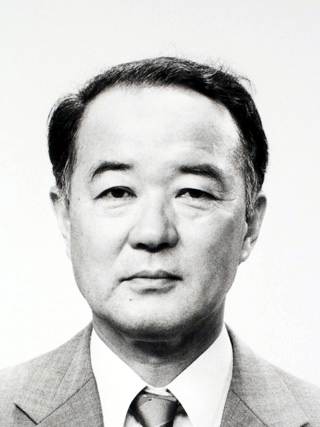
- Kazuhiko Nishijima
- Born: 4 October 1926; Tsuchiura, Japan
- Died: 15 February 2009 (aged 82); Tokyo, Japan
- Education: University of Tokyo; Osaka University
- Known for: Strangeness; Gell-Mann–Nishijima formula
- Scientific career
- Fields: Theoretical physics Particle physics
- Workplaces: Osaka City University; Max Planck Institute for Physics; Institute for Advanced Study; University of Illinois at Urbana-Champaign; University of Tokyo; Kyoto University; Chuo University

Kazuhiko Nishijima (西島 和彦, Nishijima Kazuhiko) (4 October 1926 – 15 February 2009) was a Japanese physicist who made significant contributions to particle physics. He was professor emeritus at the University of Tokyo and Kyoto University until his death in 2009.

He was born in Tsuchiura, Japan. He is most well known for his work on the Gell-Mann–Nishijima formula, and the concept of strangeness, which he called the "eta-charge" or "η-charge", after the eta meson (η).

He was nominated for the Nobel Prize in Physics in 1960, 1961, 1964, 1966~1970.

== Life ==
Nishijima was born in Tsuchiura, Japan on 4 October 1926. He obtained his diploma in physics at the University of Tokyo in 1948, and his PhD from Osaka University in 1955 for his thesis on the nuclear potential.

In 1950, while at Osaka University, Nishijima was hired by Yoichiro Nambu to work on the theory of strong interactions and of strange particles (then called V particles). While studying the decay of these particles, Nishijima developed, with Tadao Nakano, and independently of Murray Gell-Mann, a formula that would relate the quantum numbers of these particles, the Gell-Mann–Nishijima formula (or sometimes the NNG formula, for Nishijima, Nakano, and Gell-Mann),

$$Q = I_\text{3} + \frac{B+S}{2}$$

where Q is the electric charge, I_{3} is the isospin projection, B is the baryon number, and S is the strangeness quantum number of the particle. This formula was pivotal for the later development of the quark model by Gell-Mann and George Zweig in 1964 (independently of each other).

From 1956 to 1958, Nishijima worked in Göttingen, Germany, upon the invitation of Werner Heisenberg. In 1958, he moved to the United States and joined the Institute for Advanced Study in Princeton, New Jersey. A year and a half later, he became a professor at the University of Illinois at Urbana–Champaign. In 1966, he returned to the University of Tokyo, where he founded a theoretical physics research group and served in some administrative positions. From 1986 until 1989, he served as the director of the Research Institute for Fundamental Physics at Kyoto University, and from 1995 until 2005, he was the president of the Nishina Memorial Foundation, a foundation that promotes physics in Japan (in 1955 he was the first recipient of the physics prize awarded by the foundation).

Nishijima remained active in physics research until near the end of his life. His final subjects of study were color confinement and noncommutative quantum field theory.

He died of leukemia on 15 February 2009 at the age of 82.

== Books ==
- Nishijima, K (1963). Fundamental Particles. W. A. Benjamin. OCLC 536472.
- Nishijima, K (1998) [1974]. Fields and Particles: Field Theory and Dispersion Relations (4th ed.). Benjamin Cummings. ISBN 0-8053-7399-3.

== Recognition ==
- Nishina Memorial Prize (1955)
- Fellow of the American Physical Society (1961)
- Japan Academy Prize (1964)
- Person of Cultural Merit (1993)
- Order of Culture of Japan (2003)
- Guggenheim Fellowship (1965)
