= Laboratori Nazionali di Frascati =

Nuclear physics research institute in Frascati, Italy

Coordinates: 41.82070°N 12.67313°E

Frascati National Laboratory of INFN
- Overview of Frascati National Laboratory of INFN.
- Established: August 8, 1954 (as National Accelerator Laboratory)
- Research type: Accelerator physics
- Field of research: Particle physics
- Director: Paola Gianotti
- Address: Via E. Fermi 54, I-00044 Frascati, Italy
- Location: Frascati, Rome, Italy
- Nickname: LNF
- Affiliations: INFN
- Website: www.lnf.infn.it

The INFN National Laboratory of Frascati (LNF) was founded in 1954 with the objective of furthering particle physics research, and more specifically to host the 1.1 GeV electrosynchrotron, the first accelerator ever built in Italy. The Laboratory later developed the first ever electron-positron collider: from the first prototype AdA, which demonstrated the feasibility, to the ring ADONE and later on to DAΦNE, still operative today (2024). LNF was also the proposed site of the cancelled particle accelerator SuperB.

Besides conducting experiments with their own facilities, the LNF researchers are also taking part in extensive collaborations at external laboratories, especially at CERN and in the United States.

It is located in Frascati, Italy.

== History and activity ==
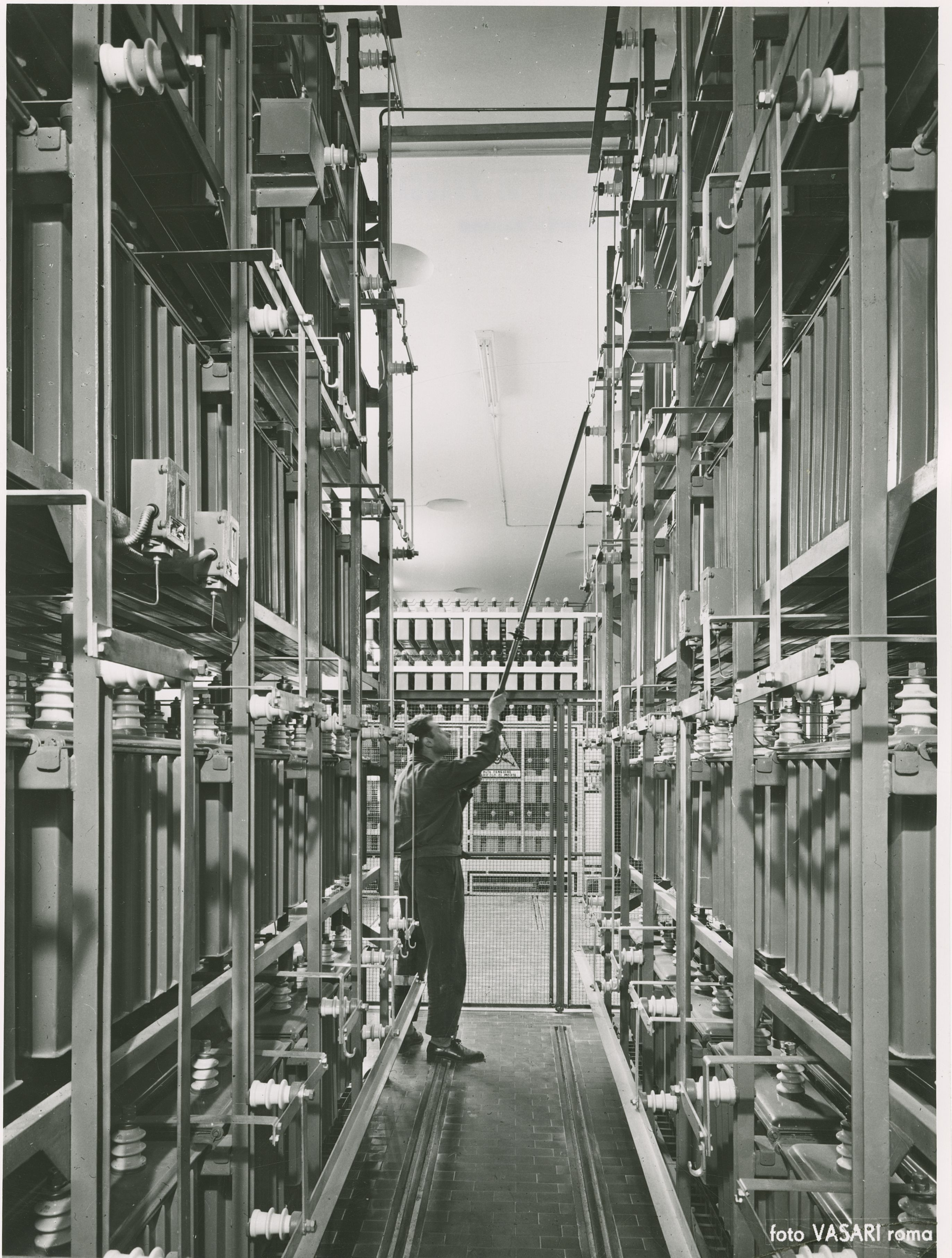
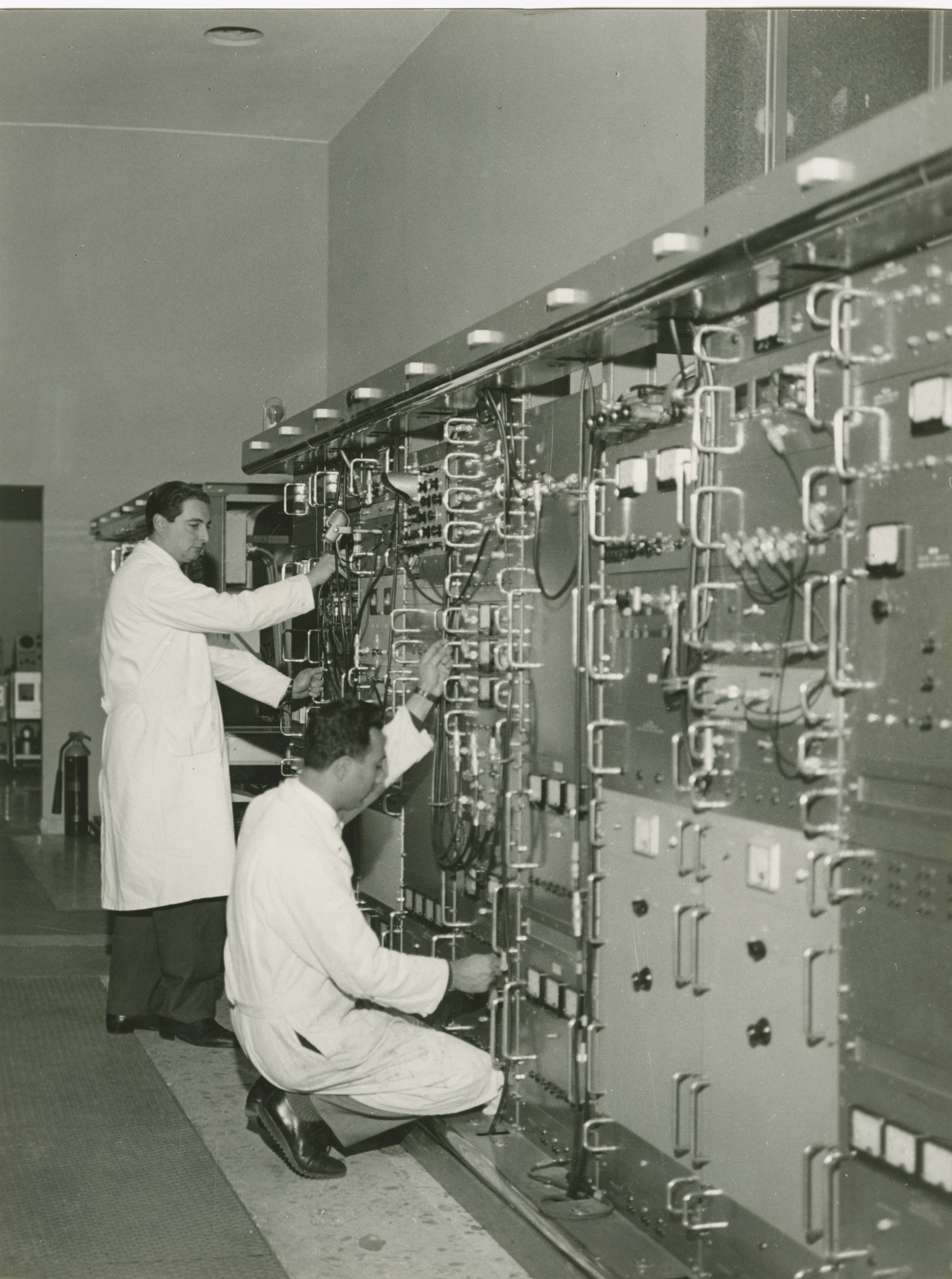
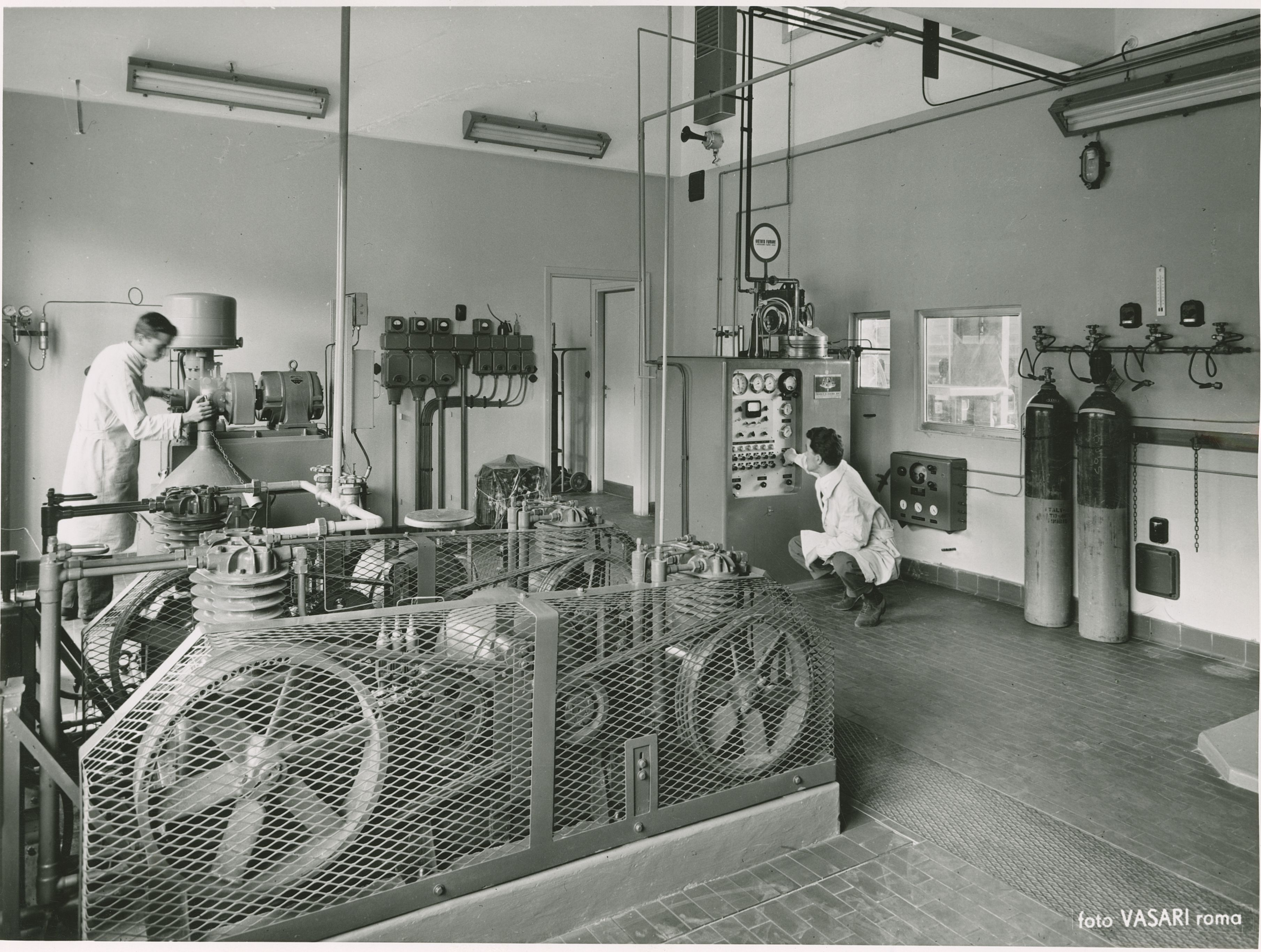
Laboratori nazionali di Frascati in 1958

The INFN National Laboratory of Frascati was founded in 1954 to host an electron synchrotron of 1.1 GeV. The Electron Synchrotron (also known as the Electron Synchrotron of Frascati, "elettrosincrotrone di Frascati"), built under the lead of Giorgio Salvini started working in 1959, generating gamma-ray bundles (even polarized) of energy 0.4–1.1 GeV and electron beams in the experiments led by INFN researchers in collaboration with a number of Italian universities. The device was a 9 meter diameter ring consisting of 4 bending magnets and 4 short straight sections.

During a seminar in 1960, Bruno Touschek proposed the idea of injecting in the same ring beams of electrons and positrons, circulating in opposite directions, to study their collisions. Hence, AdA (Anello di Accumulazione) was built, within a 1.5 m diameter electro-magnet where the radiofrequency field would accelerate the beams up to 250 MeV (center-of-mass energy 500 MeV). AdA was later moved to the Laboratory of Orsay, Paris, which had a more powerful injector; here the first electron-positron collisions were detected.

AdA's success led to the design of a more powerful machine: ADONE, with 4 experimental zones and energy of beams being 1.5 GeV (center-of-mass energy 3 GeV). ADONE started operating in 1969 and was permanently turned off in 1993. ADONE's experiments revolved around quantum electrodynamics (QED) tests, proton and neutron form factors, muon study and multihadron production. That last one in particular, more abundant than anticipated, represented an important validation of the quark model and the color hypothesis.

In November 1974, within two days after the SLAC and BNL announcement, the LNF second generation experiments observed the J/ψ particle. In order to produce the J/ψ it was necessary to operate ADONE at about 100 MeV above its maximum nominal energy; that was the reason why the J/ψ had not been found before by LNF experiments.

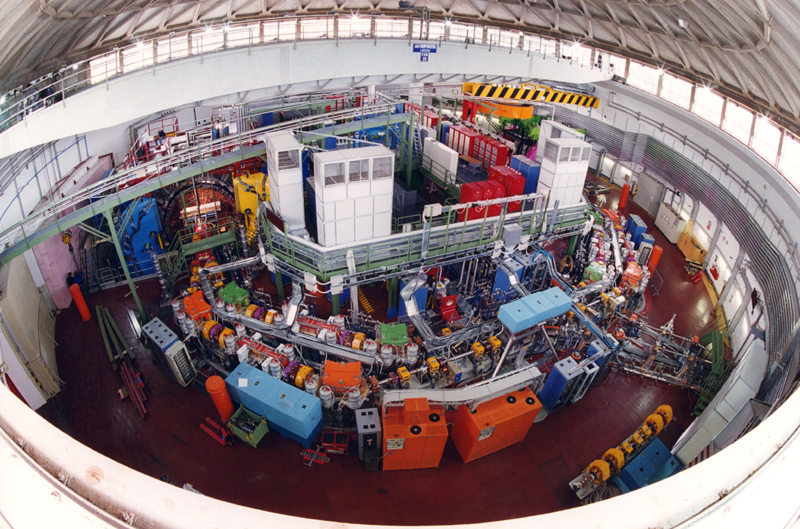
Overview of the DAΦNE hall.

In 2002, in the same hall as ADONE, the latest machine, DAΦNE, entered in function. It had been designed to operate at Φ resonance, with incredibly intense beams, to search the CP violation in K neutral mesons (KLOE experiment). Many of the other DAΦNE experiments concerned the production of hypernuclei (FINUDA) and the study of kaonic atoms (DEAR, SIDDHARTA).

Derived from the electron beam of the DAΦNE Linac, particle beams of different kinds – electrons, positrons, photons and neutrons – are available at the BTF (Beam Test Facility) laboratory. The users of this infrastructure are Italian and foreign researchers who come for testing and calibrating detectors for use in high-energy physics experiments. Recently the BTF has been upgraded with the construction of a second beam line: line number 1 is, from 2018, exclusively dedicated to the PADME experiment, to investigate dark matter, while for the test activities line number 2 has been realized.

At the same time some of the LNF researchers took part in important foreign experiments: at CERN, in US laboratories (Fermilab, SLAC, Jefferson Lab), in Hamburg and recently even in Beijing and Japan.

LNF participation in the experiments ATLAS, CMS, ALICE, and LHCb at the CERN LHC collider is especially relevant. Also important has been the role of the LNF in the experiments at the Laboratories of Gran Sasso: in particular, the experiment OPERA, studying neutrino's oscillation of a beam coming from CERN.

At LNF, thanks to the presence of high technology support services, the experimental activity also takes on the design and development of detectors meant to be employed both at the local experiments and the external ones.

An example for this was the cryogenic antenna Nautilus (1992-2018), in operation for the search of gravitational waves, predicted by Albert Einstein's general relativity theory.

At the LNF a group of theoretical physicists is also operative. These researchers, in addition to leading independent research, offer guidance and expert advice to the experimental groups.

The design, building and work on the various LNF accelerators entailed the birth and development of a large number of physicists, engineers and technicians skilled in the physics of accelerators as well as external realizations, such as CNAO (Centro Nazionale di Adroterapia Oncologica) in Pavia, and collaborations on future sector developments, such as CLIC at CERN.

At the Laboratory new lines of research were also developed, in particular the experimental facility SPARC, which combines an electron beam of high brilliancy with high intensity, ultrafast laser pulses, devoted to research about plasma acceleration and free electron laser (FEL).

An important part of the LNF's activities is also the dissemination of science. Seminars, meetings, refresher courses for high school teachers and general public events take place regularly, as well as school visits and stages for students. Furthermore, the "Open Day" and the participation to "European Researchers' Night" are regular appointments.

Around 2010, LNF participated in the SuperB collaboration, which pursued a new 1.25 km circumference underground particle accelerator SuperB to be built at the LNF site. The project was cancelled by the Italian government in 2012.

== Personnel ==
The LNF staff counts about 300 people, divided in:

- Research Division: it involves researchers, engineers and technicians who work on the experiments. It disposes of Mechanical, Electronic Computing and Outreach Services, together with support to the experiments.
- Accelerator Division: it relies upon engineers, researchers and technicians devoted to study and operate on the accelerators; it also involves the respective internal support services.
- Technical Division: it ensures the basic and logistic support to the LNF activities. Its activities include plant design, management of the electric station and storehouse, general services. The engineering workshop and mechanical design are also managed by this division.
- Administration Service and Directorate Office: they deal with Management, Accounting and Human Resources. The current LNF Director is Dr. Paola Gianotti.

Besides the staff, the LNF also relies on host and associate personnel: students, doctoral candidates, as well as researchers from other Italian and international Institutions, who take part in the LNF activities.

== Directors ==
Giorgio Salvini	1957–1960
Italo Federico Quercia	1961–1963
Lucio Mezzetti	1964–1967
Ruggero Qurzoli	01/09/1967 – 31/08/1970
Italo Federico Quercia	01/09/1970 – 31/12/1973
Renato Cerchia	01/01/1974 – 28/02/1974
Giorgio Bellettini	01/03/1974 – 31/12/1976
Corrado Mencuccini	01/01/1977 – 30/10/1977
Renato Scrimaglio	01/11/1977 – 31/12/1983
Sergio Tazzari	01/01/1984 – 31/12/1989
Enzo Iarocci	01/01/1990 – 31/01/1996
Paolo Laurelli	01/02/1996 – 31/01/2002
Sergio Bertolucci	01/02/2002 – 21/11/2004
Mario Calvetti	22/11/2004 – 31/01/2011
Umberto Dosselli	01/02/2011 – 31/07/2015
Pierluigi Campana	01/08/2015 – 31/07/2020
Fabio Bossi	01/08/2020 – 31/07/2024
Paola Gianotti	01/08/2024 – now

== Location and infrastructures ==
The National Laboratory of Frascati is located about 20 km (12 mi) away from Rome, near the town of Frascati, in a 20-hectare area with wide green spaces. An auditorium able to host 300 visitors allows the LNF to host conferences of international interest.
