= DAFNE =

Italian electron-positron collider

Coordinates: 41.82391146°N 12.67203691°E

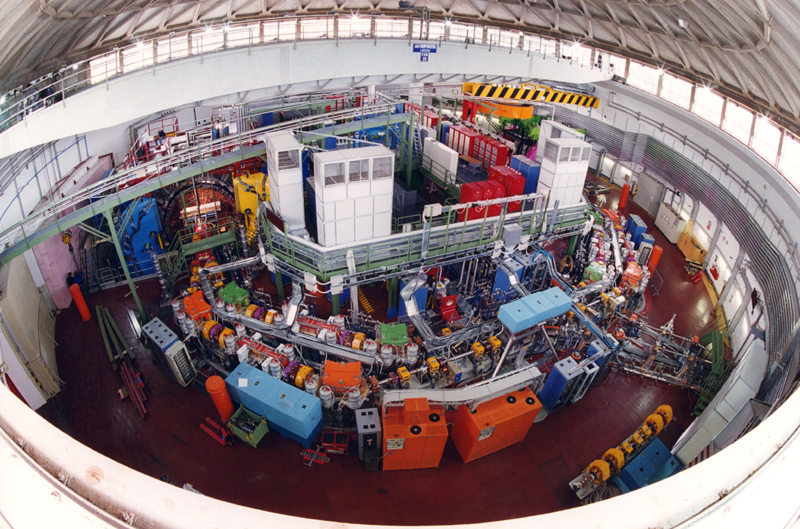
Overview of the hall of the e + e- collider DAFNE at the Frascati National Laboratory of INFN

DAFNE or DAΦNE (Double Annular Φ Factory for Nice Experiments), is an electron-positron collider at the INFN Frascati National Laboratory in Frascati, Italy. It consists of two accelerator rings, both approximately 100 meters in length. Since 1999 it has been colliding electrons and positrons at a center of mass energy of 1.02 GeV to produce phi mesons (φ) almost at rest in the laboratory frame. The phi meson is very short-lived (with a mean lifetime of about 10^{−22} seconds), and decays promptly; 85% of these decays are into kaon pairs, making kaon physics the principal subject of most of the experiments at DAFNE.

There have been five experiments at DAFNE:

- KLOE (K LOng Experiment), led by Juliet Lee-Franzini, which studied CP violation in kaon decays and rare kaon decays from 2000 to 2006. This experiment was followed by the KLOE-2 experiment.
- FINUDA (FIsica NUcleare a DAFNE), studies the spectra and nonmesonic decays of hypernuclei containing lambda baryons (Λ). The hypernuclei are produced by negatively charged kaons (K^{−}) striking a thin target.
- DEAR (DAFNE Exotic Atoms Research experiment), determines scattering lengths in atoms made from a kaon and a proton or deuteron.
- DAFNE Light Laboratory (DAΦNE-L) consists of 3 lines of synchrotron radiation emitted by DAFNE, a fourth is under construction.
- SIDDHARTA (SIlicon Drift Detectors for Hadronic Atom Research by Timing Application), aims to improve the precision measurements of X-ray transitions in kaon atoms studied at DEAR.
