= Sekazi Mtingwa =

American theoretical high-energy physicist (born 1949)

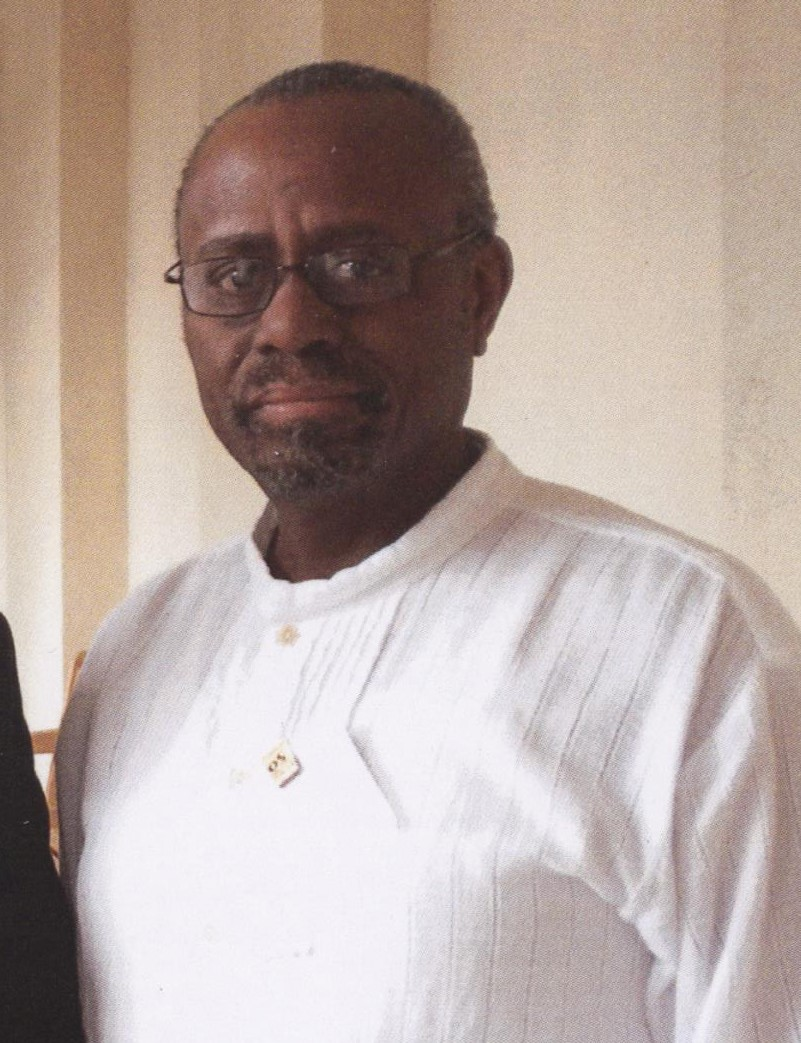
- 2012 Ford Fellows Conference
- Born: October 20, 1949 (age 76); Atlanta, Georgia, US
- Education: Massachusetts Institute of Technology; Princeton University
- Awards: Robert R. Wilson Prize for Achievement in the Physics of Particle Accelerators; American Nuclear Society Distinguished Service Award; National Society of Black Physicists' Outstanding Service Award
- Scientific career
- Fields: High energy physics
- Doctoral advisor: Curtis Callan

Sekazi Kauze Mtingwa: (born Michael Von Sawyer; October 20, 1949) is an American theoretical high-energy physicist. He is a co-recipient of the 2017 Robert R. Wilson Prize for Achievement in the Physics of Particle Accelerators. He is the first African-American to be awarded the prize. Mtingwa was elected a Fellow of the American Physical Society (APS) in 2008 for "his definitive treatment of Intrabeam scattering, his contributions to the wakefield acceleration, and his early recognition of the fixed target physics potential of the next generation electron-positron collider." He also co-founded the National Society of Black Physicists in 1977 and served in various other national and international initiatives.

== Early life and education ==
Mtingwa was born in Atlanta, Georgia on October 20, 1949. His father was a Lockheed assembly line worker, and his mother was a nurse's assistant.

He attended segregated schools until 10th grade. In that year, the Georgia State Science Fair was integrated, and Mtingwa won first place in biology. He was the first African-American to win. His prize included books in science, mathematics, and engineering, including three books on Einstein's theory of special relativity, which inspired him to pursue physics as a career.

He studied physics and pure mathematics at the Massachusetts Institute of Technology (MIT), where he received B.S. degrees in both subjects in 1971. While an undergraduate, he helped found the Interphase EDGE (then Project Interphase) program to prepare incoming students in subjects such as physics and math. He was also involved in the student protests of the late 1960s. Afterwards, he joined graduate school at Princeton University, where he earned a Ph. D. degree in theoretical high energy physics in 1976. The title of his PhD thesis is "Asymptotic chiral invariance and its consequences," which he completed under the supervision of Curtis Callan. While in graduate school, he changed his name from Michael Von Sawyer to Sekazi Kauze Mtingwa, a Tanzanian name.

== Career ==
After graduating from Princeton, Mtingwa took a research associate position, which turned into a part-time assistant professorship including some teaching duties, from Susumu Okubo at the University of Rochester. There in Rochester, Mtingwa met and soon married Estella Johnson. In 1978, he took a post-doctoral research position at the University of Maryland, College Park in the Center for Theoretical Physics.

Mtingwa received a Ford Foundation fellowship in 1980 and took it to Fermilab in Illinois for a one-year postdoctoral position, and became a research physicist there in 1981. In joint work with James Bjorken, an American theoretical physicist who is Emeritus Professor at the Stanford Linear Accelerator Center, he developed a theory of "intrabeam scattering" in particle accelerators. For this work, he was awarded the 2017 Robert R. Wilson Prize for Achievement in the Physics of Particle Accelerators, since that theory "empowered major discoveries in a broad range of disciplines by a wide variety of accelerators, including hadron colliders, damping rings/linear colliders, and low emittance synchrotron light sources."

While at Fermilab, he also contributed in a significant way to two of the antiproton source accelerator systems, which were instrumental in particle discoveries, including that of the top quark.

In 1988–1991, Mtingwa worked at Argonne National Laboratory, where he developed theory of advanced wakefield and plasma acceleration and of the photon colliders. Starting in 1991, he joined the faculty at North Carolina A&T State University as Chair and Professors of Physics (with a brief stint at Morgan State University in 1997–1999). From 2001 to 2003, he was a visiting professor of physics at MIT, followed by two years as a visiting professor of physics at Harvard University. He returned to MIT in 2006. He retired in 2012 and has since focused on outreach efforts.

He is a Fellow of the American Physical Society (elected in 2008) and of the American Association for the Advancement of Science (elected in 2015).
