= Sergio Bertolucci =

Italian particle physicist

- Born: 1 January 1950 (age 76); La Spezia, Liguria, Italy
- Education: University of Pisa; DESY
- Occupation: Particle physicist

Sergio Bertolucci (born 1 January 1950) is an Italian particle physicist, and a former director of research and scientific computing at CERN (Conseil Européen pour la Recherche Nucléaire).

== Early life ==
He was born in La Spezia. He studied particle physics at the University of Pisa. He did further research at DESY in Germany.

== Career ==
=== LNF ===
From 2002 to 2004 he worked at the Laboratori Nazionali di Frascati (LNF), where he was director.

=== INFN ===
From 2005 to 2008 he worked at Istituto Nazionale di Fisica Nucleare (INFN) in Italy.

=== CERN ===
He served as CERN director of research from 2009 to 2015.
