= Simonetta Liuti =

Italian nuclear physicist

Simonetta Liuti is an Italian theoretical nuclear physicist whose research aims at understanding the internal structure of nucleons (protons and neutrons). She is a research professor of theoretical nuclear and particle physics at the University of Virginia.

== Education and career ==
Liuti received a laurea (then the Italian equivalent of a master's degree) at the University of Perugia in 1984. She went on to a doctorate at Sapienza University of Rome in 1989, supervised by Claudio Ciofi degli Atti.

She worked at the Istituto Nazionale di Fisica Nucleare in Italy, first as a postdoctoral researcher and then as a staff scientist, from 1989 until 2001. In 2001 she moved to her present position as a research professor at the University of Virginia.

== Recognition ==
Liuti was named as a Fellow of the American Physical Society (APS) in 2024, after a nomination from the APS Topical Group on Hadronic Physics, "for advances in studying the three-dimensional quark and gluon structure of nucleons and nuclei through polarization observables in deeply virtual exclusive scattering and physics-informed deep learning architectures, and for significant service to the physics community, particularly the support and mentoring of female and other underrepresented scientists".

== Personal life ==
Liuti was married to Vietnamese physicist P. Q. Hung (1950–2024), also a professor at the University of Virginia; they had three children.
