= Giancarlo Rossi =

Italian physicist

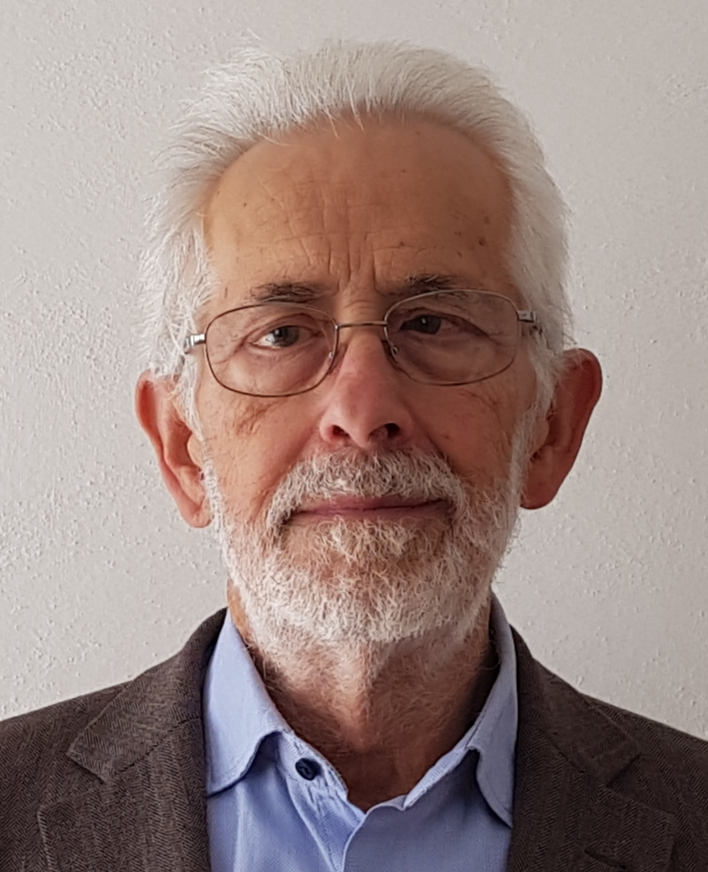
- Born: January 4, 1943; Rome, Italy
- Died: February 24, 2025 (aged 82); Rocca di Papa, Italy
- Education: University of Rome "La Sapienza"
- Known for: Lattice QCD; Chiral gauge theory; Supersymmetry; AdS/CFT correspondence
- Scientific career
- Fields: Theoretical physics
- Workplaces: University of Rome "Tor Vergata", University of L'Aquila, CERN, CNRS, University of Washington, DESY
- Doctoral advisor: Bruno Touschek

Giancarlo Rossi (4 January 1943 – 24 February 2025) was an Italian physicist.

== Biography ==
Giancarlo Rossi was an Italian theoretical physicist working in theoretical elementary particle physics. He authored more than 200 publications contributing to a broad array of fields, including lattice field theory, string theory, non-perturbative effects in quantum field theory, and biophysics.

The core of Rossi's scientific career lays in lattice field theory, including a perturbative proof of the continuum limit of renormalised quantum chromodynamics (QCD), the development of formulations for chiral gauge theories and supersymmetry, and studies of the spin structure of hadrons on the lattice.

Rossi was born in Rome and earned his degree in physics in 1966 from the University of Rome "La Sapienza", under the supervision of Bruno Touschek. His thesis was entitled "Annihilation e^{+}e^{-} → μ^{+}μ^{-} + γ and the Bloch–Nordsieck Method".

He began his academic career at the Universities of Rome "La Sapienza" and of L'Aquila, serving first as assistant professor. In 1982, he became associate professor, and in 1987, he was appointed full professor of theoretical physics at the University of L'Aquila. From 1990 onward, he held the chair of mathematical methods in physics at the University of Rome "Tor Vergata".

Giancarlo Rossi carried out research at several institutions. Between 1975 and 1977, he worked at the Theory Division of CERN in Geneva. From 1979 to 1980, he was Associé Scientifique at the Centre d'Études Nucléaires (CEN) in Saclay, France. In 1980–81, he was a Chargé de Recherche at the CNRS at the University of Paris-Sud. He returned to CERN multiple times as a Scientific Associate, including in the academic years 1982–83 and 2000–01. He also collaborated regularly with the University of Washington in Seattle, and in 2004 and 2005 he was an Invited Scientist at the NIC laboratory of DESY in Zeuthen, Germany.

== Scientific contributions ==
Among Rossi's scientific contributions are:

- The quantisation of non-Abelian gauge theories in the temporal gauge using the path integral formalism (with Massimo Testa).
- The extension of duality concepts to meson–baryon and baryon–baryon amplitudes, introducing baryonium states and the junction model for baryons, in collaboration with Gabriele Veneziano.
- The development of a non-perturbative method to recover chiral invariance of QCD in the continuum from Wilson fermions, analysing Ward identities and operator mixing.
- A formulation of chiral gauge theories on the lattice, enforcing Slavnov–Taylor identities at leading order based on BRST symmetry.
- The exact, non-perturbative calculation of correlators in supersymmetric theories (notably with N=1 supersymmetry), revealing novel non-perturbative mechanisms of dynamical supersymmetry breaking.
- The introduction of twisted mass lattice QCD, improving observables at order a, preserving positivity of the fermion determinant, and reducing operator mixing.
- The application of twisted mass QCD in the European Twisted Mass Collaboration to calculate masses, decay constants, form factors, and B meson properties via heavy-quark simulations.
- One of the first non-perturbative verifications of the AdS/CFT correspondence, showing quantitative agreement between instantons in N=4 supersymmetric field theory and D-instantons in type IIB supergravity on AdS_{5}×S^{5}.
- The derivation of a general formula for the stress tensor in molecular systems, valid in all statistical ensembles.
- Studies on biological macromolecules using ab initio methods and predictive models to identify active sites in proteins and DNA, with a focus on metalloproteins such as prions and beta-amyloids.

== Award ==
In 2004, Rossi was awarded a Humboldt Research Award by the Alexander von Humboldt Foundation.

== Selected works ==
- Bruno Touschek, Giancarlo Rossi, Meccanica Statistica, Boringhieri, 1970. ISBN 978-88-339-5373-1
