= ADA collider =

Italian particle accelerator

ADA (short for Anello Di Accumulazione, also stylized as AdA) was one of the first Italian particle accelerators and the first-ever electron–positron particle collider, measuring approximately 1.3 metres (4 ft 3 in) in diameter and designed to store beams of 250 MeV.

== History ==
The AdA collider was built at the LNF (Frascati National Laboratory) in Frascati by a group of Italian physicists led by the Austrian physicist Bruno Touschek, the person to propose the idea of its development. During this time, many American physicists were interested in colliding two beams of particles head-on instead of beams on fixed targets. ADA replaced one of the beams of particles (electrons) with a beam of antiparticles (positrons), a modification that was new and never before tested.

After the machine's construction, it was operated from 1961 to 1964 by the National Institute of Nuclear Physics (INFN), in Frascati, Italy. In 1962, the machine was relocated to the Laboratoire de l’Accelerateur Lineaire in Orsay, France, where it was used for an additional four years alongside the laboratory's powerful particle injector.

Towards the end of 1963, AdA's first electron-positron collisions were recorded and the machine was operated successfully a few more years before dismantling. AdA was never used to collect physics data, it was a testing ground for a type of machine that was to change the course of particle physics in the following decades.

The ADA collider is no longer operational but the legacy of the machine lives on today. On 5 December 2013, the Italian National Institute of Nuclear Physics (INFN) Frascati National Laboratory (LNF) became an European Physical Society (EPS) Historic Site.

== Impact ==
The ADA collider had a large impact on accelerator physics. It proved the possibility of accelerating and colliding a beam of particles and antiparticles in the same machine. The ADA collider was first in a long line of particle and antiparticle colliders and storage rings, including the Frascati National Laboratory's ADONE (big AdA or Higher energy collider) and CERN's Large Electron-Positron collider. ADA's success was also instrumental in discovering the Touschek effect in 1963 that explains how beam lifetime is affected by the scattering of particles inside a beam. It also allowed scientists to witness the interaction and annihilation of particles and antiparticles during energetic collisions, and allowing physicists to understand better several aspects of accelerator physics.

== See also ==
- ADONE
- Istituto Nazionale di Fisica Nucleare
- Laboratori Nazionali di Frascati
