= Michael Tuts =

- Education: MIT; Stony Brook University
- Known for: ATLAS; Higgs boson D0 experiment
- Awards: Presidential Award for Outstanding Teaching
- Scientific career
- Fields: Experimental physics Particle physics
- Workplaces: Columbia University
- Thesis: Search for the Rare Decay Μ+ ---> E + Γ (1979)
- Doctoral advisor: Juliet Lee-Franzini

Philip Michael Tuts is an American high-energy experimental particle physicist, and Professor and Chair of the Columbia University Physics Department. Tuts is a Fellow of the American Physical Society. He holds a seat on the executive committees of the United States LHC Users' Association and the American Physics Society Forum on Physics and Society, and is Divisional Councilor of the Division of Particles and Fields of APS. Tuts earned his Bachelor's in Physics from MIT in 1974, and his MA and PhD from the State University of New York at Stony Brook in 1976 and 1979, respectively. He joined the physics department at Columbia University in the City of New York in 1983 and was appointed Chair in 2014. Tuts is currently a member of the ATLAS experiment team at CERN and formerly served as US ATLAS Operations Program Manager.

As operations manager, he led the team of 400 American physicists working on ATLAS during the experiment that led to the discovery of the Higgs boson. Tuts is project manager of the D0 experiment at Fermilab and also leads the Calorimeter subgroup.

Tuts has also used the CUSB detector at the Cornell Electron Storage Ring to investigate the Upsilon meson. Tuts has authored over 600 publications in Physics. He believes in the importance of public outreach by prominent physicists and the science community, and writes a blog for the Huffington Post. Professor Tuts has also given talks about his work at amateur societies and for lay audiences, and organized a gathering to watch the Higgs Boson announcement at Columbia University at 3 a.m. ET (9a.m. Geneva time). At Columbia, he teaches introductory undergraduate mechanics and electromagnetics courses, which he enjoys. In 2004, Tuts was awarded a Presidential Award for Outstanding Teaching. He has stated that he has been mistaken for Stephen King on several occasions.

== Selected publications ==
- "Observation of the ϒ´´´ at the Cornell Electron Storage Ring", with CUSB Collaboration, Phys. Rev. Lett. 45, 222 (1980).
- "Observation of P-Wave BB̅ Bound States", with CUSB Collaboration, Phys. Rev. Lett. 49, 1612 (1984)
- "Measurement of the Upsilon Mass", with W. W. Mackay et al. and the CUSB collaboration, Phys. Rev. Lett. 55, 36 (1985).
- "CUSB-II a high precision electromagnetic spectrometer", with CUSB Collaboration, Nucl. Instrum. Methods AA309, 450 (1991)
- "Observation of the Top Quark, with the D0 Collaboration", Phys. Rev. Lett.. 74, 2632 (1995)
- "Limits on the ZZg and Zgg couplings in pbarp Collisions at S1/2 = 1.8 TeV", with the D0 Collaboration, Phys. Rev. Lett. 75, 1028 (1995)
- "Search for Large Extra Dimensions in Dielectron and Diphoton production", Phys. Rev. Lett. {86} 1156 (2001)
- "Search for Leptoquark Pairs Decaying to nunu+Jets in pbarp Collisions at sqrt(s)=1.8 TeV", Phys. Rev. Lett. {88}, 191801 (2002)
