= Phi meson =

Subatomic particle

- Feynman diagram of the most common ϕ meson decay
- Composition: ϕ^{0}: ss̅
- Statistics: Bosonic
- Family: Mesons
- Interactions: Strong, Weak, Gravity, Electromagnetism
- Symbol: ϕ, ϕ^{0}
- Antiparticle: Self
- Theorized: Sakurai (1962)
- Discovered: Connolly et al. (1963)
- Types: 1
- Mass: 1019.461±0.020 MeV/c^{2}
- Mean lifetime: (1.55±0.01)×10^{−22} s
- Decays into: K^{+} + K^{−}; K^{0}_{S} + K^{0}_{L}; ρ + π; π^{+} + π^{0} + π^{−}
- Electric charge: 0
- Spin: 1
- Isospin: 0
- Hypercharge: 0
- Parity: −1
- C parity: −1

Quark structure of the phi meson, is a vector meson formed of a strange quark and a strange antiquark.

In particle physics, the phi meson or ϕ meson is a vector meson formed of a strange quark and a strange antiquark. It was the ϕ meson's unexpected propensity to decay into K^{0} and K̅^{0} that led to the discovery of the OZI rule. It has a mass of 1019.461±0.020 MeV/c^{2} and a mean lifetime of 1.55±0.01 × 10^{−22} s .

== Properties ==
The most common decay modes of the ϕ meson are K^{+}K^{−} at 48.9%±0.5%, K^{0}_{S}+K^{0}_{L} at 34.2%±0.4%, and various indistinguishable mixed combinations of rho mesons and pions at 15.3%±0.3%. In all cases, it decays via the strong force. The pion channel would naïvely be the dominant decay channel because the collective mass of the pions is smaller than that of the kaons, making it energetically favorable; however, that decay route is suppressed by the OZI rule.

Technically, the quark composition of the ϕ meson can be thought of as a mix between ss̅, uu̅, and dd̅ states, but it is very nearly a pure ss̅ state. This can be shown by deconstructing the wave function of the ϕ into its component parts. We see that the ϕ and ω mesons are mixtures of the SU(3) wave functions as follows.

$$\phi = \psi_8\ \cos\theta\ -\ \psi_1\ \sin\theta$$,
$$\omega = \psi_8\ \sin\theta\ +\ \psi_1\ \cos\theta$$,

where

$\theta$ is the nonet mixing angle,
$\psi_8 = \frac{\ u\overline{u} + d\overline{d} - 2s\overline{s}\ }{ \sqrt{6\ } }~$ and
$$\psi_1 = \frac{\ u\overline{u} + d\overline{d} + s\overline{s}\ }{ \sqrt{3\ } } ~.$$

The mixing angle at which the components decouple completely can be calculated to be $\ \arctan\frac{ 1 }{ \sqrt{2\ } } \approx 35.3^\circ ~.$ The mixing angle of the ϕ and ω states is calculated from the masses of each state to be about 35˚, which is very close to maximum decoupling. Therefore, the ϕ meson is nearly a pure ss̅ state.

== History ==
The existence of the ϕ meson was first proposed by the Japanese American particle physicist, J. J. Sakurai, in 1962 as a resonance state between the K^{0} and the K̅^{0}. It was discovered later by Connolly et al. (1963) in a 20 inch hydrogen bubble chamber at the Alternating Gradient Synchrotron (AGS) in Brookhaven National Laboratory in Upton, NY while they were studying K^{−}p^{+} collisions at approximately 2.23 GeV/c. In essence, the reaction involved a beam of K^{−}s being accelerated to high energies to collide with protons.

The ϕ meson has several possible decay modes. The most energetically favored mode involves the ϕ meson decaying into three pions, which is what would naïvely be expected. However, we instead observe that it decays most frequently into two kaons. Between 1963 and 1966, three people, Susumu Okubo, George Zweig, and Jugoro Iizuka, each independently proposed a rule to account for the observed suppression of the three pion decay. This rule is now known as the OZI rule and is also the currently accepted explanation for the unusually long lifetimes of the J/ψ and ϒ mesons. Namely, on average they last ~ 7 × 10^{−21} s and ~ 1.5 × 10^{−20} s respectively. This is compared to the normal mean lifetime of a meson decaying via the strong force, which is on the order of 10^{−23} s .

In 1999, a ϕ factory named DAFNE (or DAϕNE since the F stands for "ϕ Factory") began operation to study the decay of the ϕ meson in Frascati, Italy. It produces ϕ mesons via electron-positron collisions. It has numerous detectors, including the KLOE detector which was in operation at the beginning of its operation.

Particle name	Particle symbol	Antiparticle symbol	Quark content	Rest mass (MeV/c^{2})	I^{G}	J^{PC}	S	C	B'	Mean lifetime (s)	Commonly decays to (>5% of decays)
Phi meson	ϕ(1020)	Self	ss̅	1,019.461 ± 0.020	0^{−}	1^{−−}	0	0	0	1.55 ± 0.01 × 10^{−22} ^{^{[f]}}	K^{+} + K^{−} or K^{0}_{S} + K^{0}_{L} or (ρ + π) / (π^{+} + π^{0} + π^{−})

== See also ==
- Charmonium
- List of mesons
- List of particles
- Quark model
