= Bruno Touschek =

Austrian physicist (1921–1978)

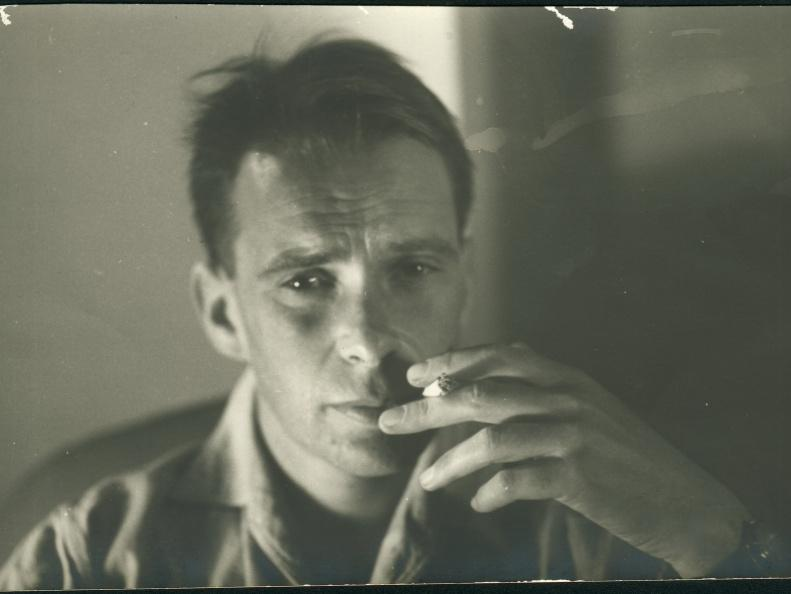
- Touschek in 1955
- Born: 3 February 1921; Vienna, Austria
- Died: 25 May 1978 (aged 57); Innsbruck, Austria
- Education: University of Göttingen; University of Glasgow
- Known for: Anello Di Accumulazione; Touschek effect
- Spouse: Elspeth Yonge (m. 1955)
- Children: 2
- Awards: Matteucci Medal (1975)
- Scientific career
- Fields: Accelerator physics; Particle physics
- Workplaces: Istituto Nazionale di Fisica Nucleare
- Doctoral advisor: John Currie Gunn
- Other academic advisors: Rudolf Peierls
- Notable students: Nicola Cabibbo; Paolo Di Vecchia; Giancarlo Rossi

Bruno Touschek (3 February 1921 – 25 May 1978) was an Austrian physicist, a survivor of the Holocaust, and initiator of research on electron-positron colliders.

== Biography ==
Touschek was born and attended school in Vienna. In 1937, he was not allowed to finish high school since his mother was Jewish. He passed the final year exam at a different school as an external pupil. Shortly after he started studying physics and mathematics at the university in Vienna, he again had to quit for racial reasons. Thanks to a couple of friends, he could keep on studying in Hamburg, where nobody knew of his origins. In order to make a living, he took up several jobs at the same time.

During this period, he worked at the Studiengesellschaft für Elektronengeräte, a company affiliated to Philips, where "drift tubes"—the forerunners of the klystron—were being developed at that time. In 1943, he asked Rolf Widerøe to cooperate with him in building a betatron, critically studying an article of Donald Kerst. In the following, Touschek, Widerøe, R. Kollath and G. Schumann worked on a 15 MeV betatron, which was constructed near Hamburg and was operational in 1944. When Touschek was arrested by the Gestapo in 1945, Widerøe visited him in prison, and during these meetings, they continued to talk about the betatron. In particular, Touschek conceived the idea of radiation damping for electrons circulating in a betatron.

Largely by chance, Touschek escaped the Kiel concentration camp to which he would have been deported. During the death march from the Hamburg prison, Touschek was shot by an SS officer, presumed dead, and thus left behind. After the war, he graduated from the university of Göttingen in 1946, where he came into contact with Werner Heisenberg and Carl Friedrich von Weizsäcker, and finished his diploma thesis.

A short time later, he was appointed at Max Planck Institute as a research worker. In 1947, he left for Glasgow on a fellowship. He was subsequently appointed an Official lecturer in Natural Philosophy at the University of Glasgow, a position he kept until he left for Rome in 1952. He decided to stay in Rome permanently, receiving the position of researcher at the National laboratories of the Istituto Nazionale di Fisica Nucleare in Frascati, near Rome. He was also appointed as a part-time lecturer at the University of Rome-La Sapienza, where he eventually became a full professor in 1978. He did, however, return to Glasgow briefly in 1955 where he married artist Elspeth Yonge (born 1931), the daughter of the eminent Scottish zoologist Charles Maurice Yonge. A son, Francis, was born in 1958, and a brother, Steven, followed in 1961.

On 7 March 1960, Touschek gave a talk in Frascati where he proposed the idea of a collider: a particle accelerator where a particle and its antiparticle circulate the same orbit in opposite direction. When bunches of opposite-moving particles and antiparticles collide, they annihilate and produce new particles depending on the collision energy. This concept is at the base of all present-day very high energy particle accelerators, such as the Large Hadron Collider (LHC) at CERN. The first electron-positron storage ring, called Anello Di Accumulazione (ADA), was constructed in Frascati under Touschek's supervision in the early sixties. During the next decade more electron-positron rings followed and their outcomes changed completely some of the physics community perceptions of the world. One of the transitions, the elementary hadrons had then turned into composite particles. Even though ADA has been turned off a long time ago, the laboratory is active and contributes to work in the field of electron linear accelerators. Significant collaborations are the LIL for LEP in 1986 and CLIC test facility at CERN.

Touschek died in Innsbruck in 1978.

== Honours and awards ==
Touschek was awarded the Matteucci Medal in 1975.

There is a street, Route Touschek, named after Touschek at CERN, Prévessin, France.

In the city of Grottaferrata, close to the Frascati Laboratories, since 1982, there is the unique high/secondary school in Italy named after him: Liceo Scientifico Statale - Bruno Touschek.

== See also ==
- Touschek effect
- Betatron
- List of famous Holocaust survivors

== Selected works ==
- Bruno Touschek, Giancarlo Rossi, Meccanica Statistica, Boringhieri, 1970. ISBN 883-395373-4
