= OZI rule =

Principle in hadron decay rates

OZI rule

Decay of the Phi meson into three pions is suppressed by the OZI rule.

Decay of the Phi meson into two Kaons is not suppressed by the OZI rule.

The Okubo–Zweig–Iizuka (OZI) rule is a consequence of quantum chromodynamics (QCD) that explains why certain decay modes appear less frequently than otherwise might be expected. It was independently proposed by Susumu Okubo, George Zweig and Jugoro Iizuka in the 1960s. It states that any strongly occurring process will be suppressed if, through only the removal of internal gluon lines, its Feynman diagram can be separated into two disconnected diagrams: one containing all of the initial-state particles and one containing all of the final-state particles.

An example of such a suppressed decay is the Phi meson into pions: φ → π^{+} + π^{−} + π^{0} . It would be expected that this decay mode would dominate over other decay modes such as φ → K^{+} + K^{−} , which have much lower Q values. In actuality, it is seen that φ decays to kaons 84% of the time, suggesting the decay path to pions is suppressed.

An explanation of the OZI rule can be seen from the decrease of the coupling constant in QCD with increasing energy (or momentum transfer). For the OZI suppressed channels, the gluons must have high q^{2} (at least as much as the rest mass energies of the quarks into which they decay) and so the coupling constant will appear small to these gluons.

Another explanation of the OZI rule comes from the large-N_{c} limit, in which the number of colors N_{c} is assumed to be infinite. The OZI suppressed processes have a higher ratio of vertices (which contribute factors of 1/N_{c}) to independent fermion loops (which contribute factors of N_{c}) when compared to the non-suppressed processes, and so these processes are much less common.

A further example is given by the decays of excited states of charmonium (bound state of charm quark and antiquark). For states lighter than the charged D mesons, the decay must proceed just like the above example into three pions, with three virtual gluons mediating the interaction, each of which must have enough energy to produce a quark-antiquark pair.

But above the D meson threshold, the original valence quarks need not annihilate; they can propagate into the final states. In this case, only two gluons are required, which share the energy of the light quark-antiquark pair that is spontaneously nucleated. They are thus lower in energy than the three gluons of the OZI-suppressed annihilation. The suppression arises from both the smaller values of the QCD coupling constant at high energies, as well as the greater number of interaction vertices.

== See also ==
- J/ψ meson

== Sources ==
- Martin, B.R.; Shaw, G. (1997). "§6.1.1 Charmonium". Particle physics (2nd ed.). Chichester, UK: John Wiley & Sons. p. 128. ISBN 0-471-92358-3.
- Griffiths, D. (2008). Introduction to Elementary Particles (2nd ed.). Germany: Wiley-VCH. §5.4.1. ISBN 978-3-527-40601-2.
