= Meenakshi Narain =

Indian-born American experimental physicist (1964–2023)

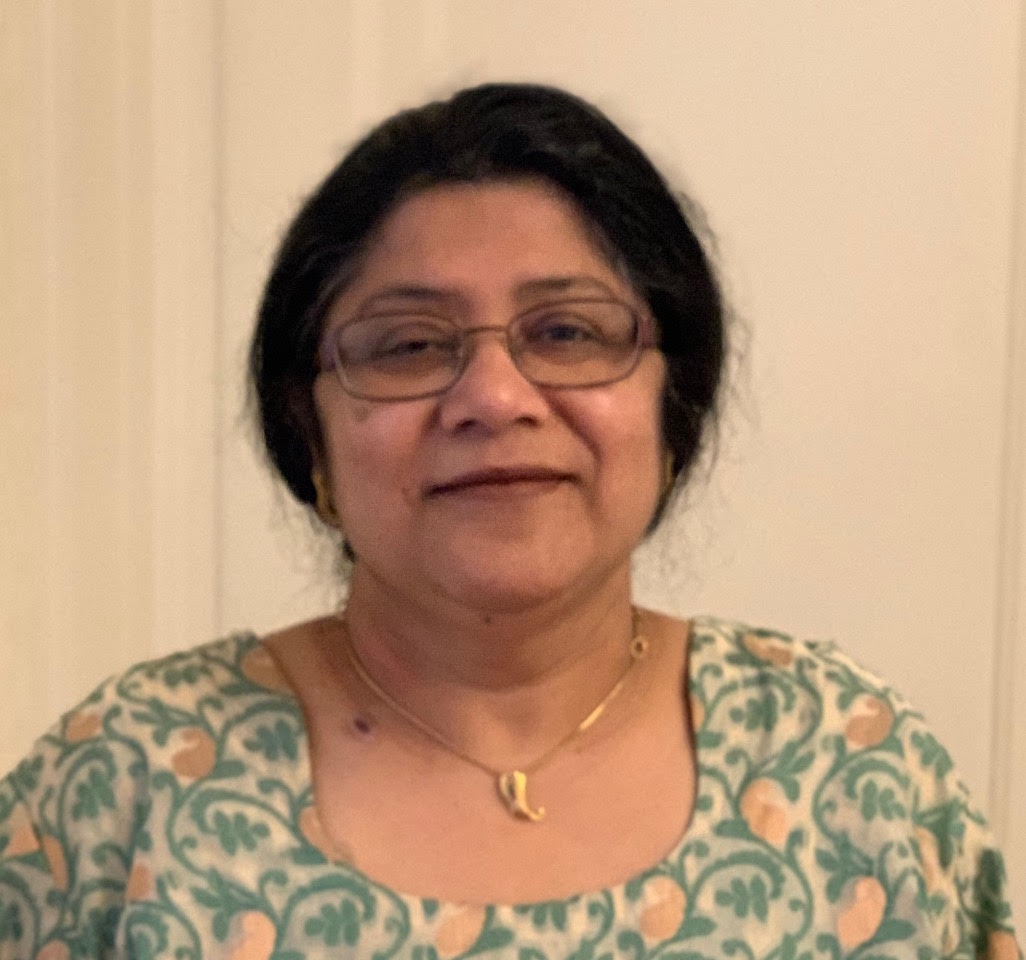
- Born: May 9, 1964; Gorakhpur, Uttar Pradesh, India
- Died: January 1, 2023 (aged 58); Providence, Rhode Island, U.S.
- Education: Gorakhpur University; IIT Kanpur; Stony Brook University
- Spouse: Ulrich Heintz
- Scientific career
- Fields: Experimental physics
- Workplaces: Boston University; Brown University
- Thesis: Inclusive photon spectra from Υ decays (1991)
- Doctoral advisor: Juliet Lee-Franzini

Meenakshi Narain (May 9, 1964 – January 1, 2023) was an Indian-born American experimental physicist. She was a Professor of Physics and Chair of the Department of Physics at Brown University, and was also Chair of the Collaboration Board of U.S. institutions in the Compact Muon Solenoid (CMS) Collaboration. She contributed to the discovery of the top quark in 1995 and Higgs Boson in 2012.

== Early life and education ==
Born on May 9, 1964, in Gorakhpur, Uttar Pradesh, India, Narain identified as an Asian-Indian American. In high school, she had to transfer to another all-girls school to study on the math track that led her to physics and statistics as an undergraduate. She had to overcome the family expectation to choose physics over law. She completed a B.Sc. at Gorakhpur University and a M.Sc. at IIT Kanpur. Narain earned her Ph.D. at Stony Brook University with her dissertation titled, Inclusive Photon Spectra from Upsilon States, under the supervision of Juliet Lee-Franzini.

== Career ==
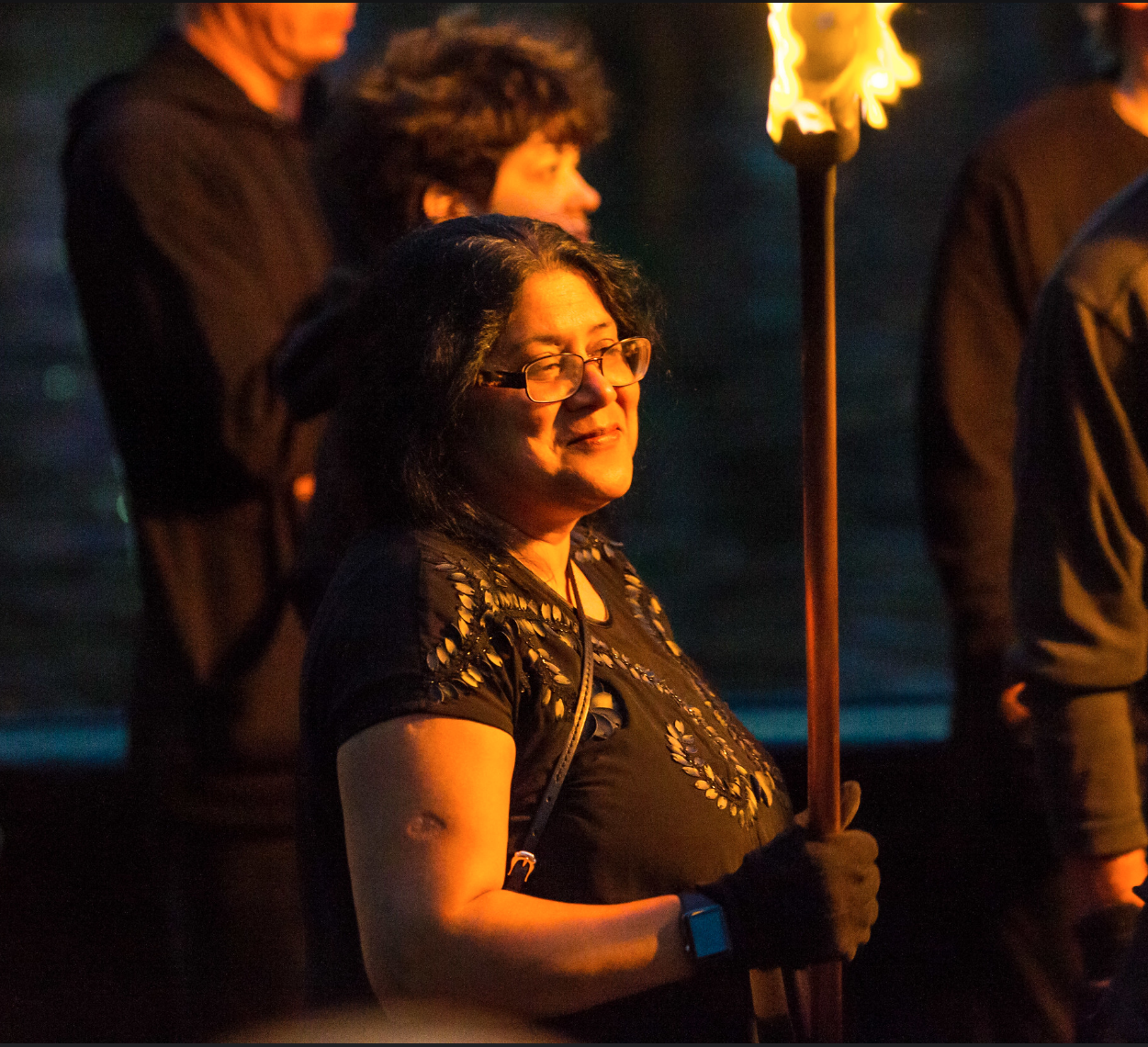
Brown Physics Professor and organizer of the Big Bang Science Fair, Meenakshi Narain, lights the WaterFire.

Following her doctorate, Narain was a visiting fellow at the Laboratory of Nuclear Studies, Cornell University, and then as a post-doc at Fermi National Accelerator Laboratory from 1991–1995, where she was also a Wilson Fellow.

Narain was on the faculty of Boston University for eight years prior to joining the Brown University faculty in 2007, where she was promoted to full professor in 2010. Her research activities have included the DØ experiment at Fermilab. She was instrumental in the discovery of the top quark in 1995.

Narain participated in the CMS experiment at the Large Hadron Collider at CERN, and contributed to the discovery Higgs Boson in 2012. She served as Chair of the Collaboration Board of U.S. institutions in the Compact Muon Solenoid (CMS) Collaboration from July 2018 to July 2022.

Narain was a frequent advocate for women in STEM fields, and she also promoted science to the general public, in events such as the WaterFire Big Bang Science Fair in Providence, Rhode Island.

== Selected publications ==
- Abachi, S.; et al. (April 3, 1995). "Observation of the Top Quark". Physical Review Letters. 74 (14): 2632–2637. arXiv:hep-ex/9503003. Bibcode:1995PhRvL..74.2632A. doi:10.1103/PhysRevLett.74.2632. hdl:1969.1/181526. ISSN 0031-9007. PMID 10057979. S2CID 42826202.
- CMS collaboration (2012). "Observation of a new boson at a mass of 125 GeV with the CMS experiment at the LHC". Physics Letters B. 716 (1): 30–61. arXiv:1207.7235. Bibcode:2012PhLB..716...30C. doi:10.1016/j.physletb.2012.08.021.

== Awards, honors ==
- 2000 Outstanding Junior Investigator Award, US Department of Energy.
- 2000 NSF Faculty Early Career Development Award (CAREER)
- 2006 Fellowship Program, Radcliffe Institute of Advanced Studies
- 2007 Fellow of the American Physical Society, cited "For important contributions to the measurement of the properties of the top quark."
- 2008 Career Development Award by the ADVANCE program at Brown
- 2012 LHC Physics Center Fellow, Fermilab
- 2020 Distinguished Alumnus Award, Indian Institute of Technology, Kanpur, India
