= KLOE (experiment) =

KLOE (or the K^{0}_{L} LOng Experiment) was both an experiment studying Φ meson decays, and the particle detector used to conduct it. It was located in the DAΦNE collider at the INFN Frascati National Laboratory in Frascati, Italy. It ceased operation in 2006 and was replaced by the KLOE-2 detector, which began operation in 2014, and continues to operate to this day.

== Etymology ==
Both the DAΦNE collider and the KLOE detector were named after the two titular characters of the ancient Greek play Daphnis and Chloe, written in the second century AD. In the story, the two grow up and fall in love, experiencing various hardships before living happily ever after. The DAΦNE collider was designed with the KLOE experiment as its primary goal, leading to the two to be named as a pair.

== KLOE ==
The KLOE experiment was the first experiment performed by the DAΦNE collider. It began in ernest when the detector began taking data in 2000 and ended when data collection stopped in 2006.

The KLOE detector was designed to witness the decays of K^{0}_{L} mesons that were created by colliding electrons and positrons at high speeds to generate large numbers of ϕ mesons, 34.2%±0.4% of which then decay into the K^{0}_{S}K^{0}_{L} pair, following the second most common decay mode. The detector was cylindrical in shape. It had a length of 6 meters and a diameter of 7 meters and was composed of a drift chamber surrounded by an electromagnetic calorimeter, both of which were kept within a constant magnetic field.

The interior drift chamber had a length of 3.3 meters and a diameter of 4 meters, within which it contained 52,000 wires, making it the largest drift chamber ever constructed at the time. The computer interpreting its data was able to calculate reconstructed particle trajectories with a precision of within 0.3%.

The electromagnetic calorimeter had a length of 4.5 meters and a diameter of 4 meters. It used alternating layers of lead with 15,000 kilometers of scintillating fibers before passing the energy from the fibers through 4880 photomultipliers. It was able to determine the energy released by a given particle to within 15% precision, and was able to distinguish between particles occurring at least 0.2 nanoseconds apart, but was limited to the computer's ability to calculate a maximum of 2000 events per second.

== KLOE-2 ==
KLOE-2 began taking data in November 2014 and is scheduled to continue taking data until at least 2018. Its first run, Run-I was begun in November 2014 and continued until July 2015, observing a total of 1 billion neutral kaon decays. The second experiment, Run-II is still in progress and aims to reach 5 billion such observations. Its drift chamber has the same dimensions as KLOE. It also uses lead and scintillating fibers and the same number of photomultiplier tubes. It uses a magnetic field strength of 0.52T.
