= Chiral gauge theory =

Gauge theory where some left-handed and right-handed Weyl fermions have different charges

In quantum field theory, a chiral gauge theory is a quantum field theory with charged chiral (i.e. Weyl) fermions. For instance, the Standard Model, specifically the electroweak interaction, is a chiral gauge theory. For topological reasons, chiral charged fermions cannot be given a mass without breaking the gauge symmetry, which will lead to inconsistencies unlike a global symmetry. It is notoriously difficult to construct a chiral gauge theory from a theory which does not already contain chiral fields at the fundamental level. A consistent chiral gauge theory must have no gauge anomaly (or global anomaly). Almost by necessity, regulators will have to break the gauge symmetry. This is responsible for gauge anomalies in the first place.

== Fermion doubling on a lattice ==
According to Nielsen–Ninomiya theorem, lattice regularizations suffer from fermion doublings leading to a loss of chirality.

== See also ==
- Chiral anomaly
