= Giorgio Salvini =

Italian physicist and politician

- Born: 24 April 1920; Milan
- Died: 8 April 2015 (aged 94); Rome
- Scientific career
- Fields: Experimental physics

Giorgio Salvini (24 April 1920 – 8 April 2015) was an Italian physicist and politician.

== Life ==
Born in Milan, Salvini was responsible for the construction of the first Italian circular particle accelerator in 1953, the electron synchrotron of Frascati ("elettrosincrotrone di Frascati"). Between 1966 and 1970 he was president of the Istituto Nazionale di Fisica Nucleare (INFN). Salvini took part in the CERN experiment that led to the discovery of the W and Z bosons.

He served as president of the Accademia dei Lincei from 1990 to 1994.

He was Minister of University, Scientific Research and Technology in the Dini 1995-1996 cabinet.

== Sources ==
- Accademia Nazionale dei Lincei (2016), Annuario dell'Accademia Nazionale dei Lincei 2016 – CDXIII dalla Sua Fondazione (PDF) (in Italian), Roma: Accademia Nazionale dei Lincei, p. 507, archived from the original (PDF) on 23 September 2016. The "Yearbook" of the renowned Italian scientific institution, including an historical sketch of its history, the list of all past and present members as well as a wealth of information about its academic and scientific activities.
- Maiani, Luciano (2015) [133^{o}], "Ricordo di Giorgio Salvini" [Recollection of Giorgio Salvini] (PDF), Rendiconti della Accademia Nazionale delle Scienze Detta dei XL. Memorie di Matematica e Applicazioni, Serie V (in Italian), XXXIX (I), Roma: 39–40, ISSN 0392-4106, archived from the original (PDF) on 19 February 2017.
- Ridolfi, Roberto, ed. (1976), "Giorgio Salvini", Biografie e bibliografie degli Accademici Lincei [Biographies and bibliographies of the Lincean Academicians] (in Italian), Roma: Accademia Nazionale dei Lincei, pp. 583–587. The biographical and bibliographical entry, including a list of publications and updated up to 1976, on Giorgio Salvini, published under the auspices of the Accademia dei Lincei in a book collecting many profiles of its living members up to 1976.
