= Gell-Mann–Nishijima formula =

Quantum physics formula

The Gell-Mann–Nishijima formula (sometimes known as the NNG formula) relates the baryon number B, the strangeness S, the isospin I_{3} of quarks and hadrons to the electric charge Q. It was originally given by Kazuhiko Nishijima and Tadao Nakano in 1953, and led to the proposal of strangeness as a concept, which Nishijima originally called "eta-charge" after the eta meson. Murray Gell-Mann proposed the formula independently in 1956. The modern version of the formula relates all flavour quantum numbers (isospin up and down, strangeness, charm, bottomness, and topness) with the baryon number and the electric charge.

== Formula ==
The original form of the Gell-Mann–Nishijima formula is:

$$Q = I_3 + \frac{1}{2} (B+S)\$$

This equation was originally based on empirical experiments. It is now understood as a result of the quark model. In particular, the electric charge Q of a quark or hadron particle is related to its isospin I_{3} and its hypercharge Y via the relation:

$$Q = I_3 + \frac{1}{2} Y\$$

$$Y = 2(Q - I_3)$$

Since the discovery of charm, top, and bottom quark flavors, this formula has been generalized. It now takes the form:

$$Q = I_3 + \frac{1}{2} (B+S+C+B^\prime+T)$$

where Q is the charge, I_{3} the 3rd-component of the isospin, B the baryon number, and S, C, B′, T are the strangeness, charm, bottomness and topness numbers.

Expressed in terms of quark content, these would become:

$$\begin{align}
Q &=  \frac{2}{3}\left[\left(n_\text{u} - n_\bar{\text{u}}\right) + \left(n_\text{c} - n_\bar{\text{c}}\right) + \left(n_\text{t} - n_\bar{\text{t}}\right)\right] -
\frac{1}{3}\left[\left(n_\text{d} - n_\bar{\text{d}}\right) + \left(n_\text{s} - n_\bar{\text{s}}\right) + \left(n_\text{b} - n_\bar{\text{b}}\right)\right] \\
B &=  \frac{1}{3}\left[\left(n_\text{u} - n_\bar{\text{u}}\right) + \left(n_\text{c} - n_\bar{\text{c}}\right) + \left(n_\text{t} - n_\bar{\text{t}}\right) +
\left(n_\text{d} - n_\bar{\text{d}}\right) + \left(n_\text{s} - n_\bar{\text{s}}\right) + \left(n_\text{b} - n_\bar{\text{b}}\right)\right] \\
I_3 &=  \frac{1}{2}[(n_\text{u}-n_\bar{\text{u}})-(n_\text{d}-n_\bar{\text{d}})] \\
S &= -\left(n_\text{s} - n_\bar{\text{s}}\right);\quad C = +\left(n_\text{c} - n_\bar{\text{c}}\right);\quad B^\prime = -\left(n_\text{b} - n_\bar{\text{b}}\right);\quad T = +\left(n_\text{t} - n_\bar{\text{t}}\right)
\end{align}$$

By convention, the flavor quantum numbers (strangeness, charm, bottomness, and topness) carry the same sign as the electric charge of the particle. So, since the strange and bottom quarks have a negative charge, they have flavor quantum numbers equal to −1. And since the charm and top quarks have positive electric charge, their flavor quantum numbers are +1.

From a quantum chromodynamics point of view, the Gell-Mann–Nishijima formula and its generalized version can be derived using an approximate SU(3) flavour symmetry because the charges can be defined using the corresponding conserved Noether currents.

== Weak interaction analog ==
In 1961 Sheldon Glashow proposed a relation similar formula would also apply to the weak interaction:
$$Q = T_3 + \frac{1}{2}Y.$$
Here the charge $Q$ is related to the projection of weak isospin $T_3$ and the hypercharge $Y$.
