= Gell-Mann–Okubo mass formula =

Mass formula for hadrons

In physics, the Gell-Mann–Okubo mass formula provides a sum rule for the masses of hadrons within a specific multiplet, determined by their isospin (I) and strangeness (or alternatively, hypercharge)

$$M = a_0 + a_1 Y + a_2 \left[ I \left( I + 1 \right)-\frac{1}{4} Y^2 \right] ,$$

where a_{0}, a_{1}, and a_{2} are free parameters.

The rule was first formulated by Murray Gell-Mann in 1961 and independently proposed by Susumu Okubo in 1962. Isospin and hypercharge are generated by SU(3), which can be represented by eight hermitian and traceless matrices corresponding to the "components" of isospin and hypercharge. Six of the matrices correspond to flavor change, and the final two correspond to the third-component of isospin projection, and hypercharge.

== Theory ==
The mass formula was obtained by considering the representations of the Lie algebra su(3). In particular, the meson octet corresponds to the root system of the adjoint representation. However, the simplest, lowest-dimensional representation of su(3) is the fundamental representation, which is three-dimensional, and is now understood to describe the approximate flavor symmetry of the three quarks u, d, and s. Thus, the discovery of not only an su(3) symmetry, but also of this workable formula for the mass spectrum was one of the earliest indicators for the existence of quarks.

The formula is underlain by the octet enhancement hypothesis, which ascribes dominance of SU(3) breaking to the hypercharge generator of SU(3), $Y=\tfrac{2}{\sqrt{3}}F_8=\operatorname{diag}(1,1,-2)/3~$, and, in modern terms, the relatively higher mass of the strange quark.

This formula is phenomenological, describing an approximate relation between meson and baryon masses, and has been superseded as theoretical work in quantum chromodynamics advances, notably chiral perturbation theory.

== Baryons ==
Baryon properties
Octet
Octet	Name	Symbol	Isospin	Strangeness	Mass (MeV/c^{2})
Octet	Nucleons	N	1/2	0	939
Octet	Lambda baryons	Λ	0	−1	1116
Octet	Sigma baryons	Σ	1	−1	1193
Octet	Xi baryons	Ξ	1/2	−2	1318
Decuplet
Decuplet	Delta baryons	Δ	3/2	0	1232
Decuplet	Sigma baryons	Σ^{*}	1	−1	1385
Decuplet	Xi baryons	Ξ^{*}	1/2	−2	1533
Decuplet	Omega baryon	Ω	0	−3	1672

Using the values of relevant I and S for baryons, the Gell-Mann–Okubo formula can be rewritten for the baryon octet,

$$\frac{N + \Xi}{2} = \frac{3 \Lambda + \Sigma}{4} \,$$

where N, Λ, Σ, and Ξ represent the average mass of corresponding baryons. Using the current mass of baryons, this yields:

$$\frac{N + \Xi}{2} = 1128.5~\mathrm{MeV}/c^2$$

and

$$\frac{3 \Lambda + \Sigma}{4} = 1135.25~\mathrm{MeV}/c^2$$

meaning that the Gell-Mann–Okubo formula reproduces the mass of octet baryons within ~0.5% of measured values.

For the baryon decuplet, the Gell-Mann–Okubo formula can be rewritten as the "equal-spacing" rule

$$\Delta -\Sigma^* = \Sigma^* - \Xi^* = \Xi^* - \Omega = a_1 + 2a_2 \approx \, -147 ~\mathrm{MeV}/c^2$$

where Δ, Σ^{*}, Ξ^{*}, and Ω represent the average mass of corresponding baryons.

The baryon decuplet formula famously allowed Gell-Mann to predict the mass of the then undiscovered Ω^{−}.

== Mesons ==
The same mass relation can be found for the meson octet,

$$\frac{1}{2}\left(\frac{ K^- + \bar{K}^0 }{2} + \frac{ K^+ + K^0}{2}\right) = \frac{3\eta + \pi}{4}$$

Using the current mass of mesons, this yields

$$\frac{1}{2}\left(\frac{ K^- + \bar{K}^0 }{2} + \frac{ K^+ + K^0}{2}\right)= 496~\mathrm{MeV}/c^2$$

and

$$\frac{3\eta + \pi}{4} = 445~\mathrm{MeV}/c^2$$

Because of this large discrepancy, several people attempted to find a way to understand the failure of the GMO formula in mesons, when it worked so well in baryons. In particular, people noticed that using the square of the average masses yielded much better results:

$$\frac{1}{2}\left[ \left( \frac{ K^- + \bar{K}^0 }{2} \right)^2 + \left( \frac{ K^+ + K^0}{2} \right)^2\right] = \frac{3\eta^2 + \pi^2}{4}$$

This now yields

$$\frac{1}{2}\left[ \left( \frac{ K^- + \bar{K}^0 }{2} \right)^2 + \left( \frac{ K^+ + K^0}{2} \right)^2\right]= 246\times10^3~\mathrm{MeV^2}/c^4$$

and

$$\frac{3\eta^2 + \pi^2}{4} = 230\times10^3~\mathrm{MeV^2}/c^4$$

which fall within 5% of each other.

For a while, the GMO formula involving the square of masses was simply an empirical relationship; but later a justification for using the square of masses was found in the context of chiral perturbation theory, just for pseudoscalar mesons, since these are the pseudogoldstone bosons of dynamically broken chiral symmetry, and, as such, obey Dashen's mass formula. Other, mesons, such as vector ones, need no squaring for the GMO formula to work.

== See also ==
- Gell-Mann–Nishijima formula
- Eightfold Way
- Quark model
- SU(3)
