= Intrabeam scattering =

Effect in accelerator physics

Intrabeam scattering (IBS) is an effect in accelerator physics where collisions between particles couple the beam emittance in all three dimensions. This generally causes the beam size to grow. In proton accelerators, intrabeam scattering causes the beam to grow slowly over a period of several hours. This limits the luminosity lifetime. In circular lepton accelerators, intrabeam scattering is counteracted by radiation damping, resulting in a new equilibrium beam emittance with a relaxation time on the order of milliseconds. Intrabeam scattering creates an inverse relationship between the smallness of the beam and the number of particles it contains, therefore limiting luminosity.

The two principal methods for calculating the effects of intrabeam scattering were done by Anton Piwinski in 1974 and James Bjorken and Sekazi Mtingwa in 1983. The Bjorken-Mtingwa formulation is regarded as being the most general solution. Both of these methods are computationally intensive. Several approximations of these methods have been done that are easier to evaluate, but less general. These approximations are summarized in Intrabeam scattering formulas for high energy beams by K. Kubo et al.

Intrabeam scattering rates have a $1/\gamma^{4}$ dependence. This means that its effects diminish with increasing beam energy. Other ways of mitigating IBS effects are the use of wigglers, and reducing beam intensity. Transverse intrabeam scattering rates are sensitive to dispersion.

Intrabeam scattering is closely related to the Touschek effect. The Touschek effect is a lifetime based on intrabeam collisions that result in both particles being ejected from the beam. Intrabeam scattering is a risetime based on intrabeam collisions that result in momentum coupling.

== Bjorken–Mtingwa formulation ==
The betatron growth rates for intrabeam scattering are defined as,

$$\frac{1}{T_{p}} \ \stackrel{\mathrm{def}}{=}\  \frac{1}{\sigma_{p}} \frac{d\sigma_{p}}{dt}$$,
$$\frac{1}{T_{h}} \ \stackrel{\mathrm{def}}{=}\  \frac{1}{\epsilon_{h}^{1/2}} \frac{d\epsilon_{h}^{1/2}}{dt}$$,
$$\frac{1}{T_{v}} \ \stackrel{\mathrm{def}}{=}\  \frac{1}{\epsilon_{v}^{1/2}} \frac{d\epsilon_{v}^{1/2}}{dt}$$.

The following is general to all bunched beams,

$$\frac{1}{T_{i}} = 4\pi A (\operatorname{log}) \left\langle \int_{0}^{\infty} \,d\lambda\ \frac{\lambda^{1/2}}{[\operatorname{det}(L+\lambda I)]^{1/2}}
\left\{\operatorname{Tr}L^{i}\operatorname{Tr}\left(\frac{1}{L+\lambda I}\right) - 3 \operatorname{Tr}\left[L^{i}\left(\frac{1}{L+\lambda I}
\right)\right]\right\}\right\rangle$$,

where $T_{p}$, $T_{h}$, and $T_{v}$ are the momentum spread, horizontal, and vertical are the betatron growth times. The angle brackets <...> indicate that the integral is averaged around the ring.

$$(\operatorname{log}) = \ln \frac{b_{min}}{b_{max}} = \ln \frac{2}{\theta_{min}}$$
$$A = \frac{r_0^2 c N}{64 \pi^2 \beta^3 \gamma^4 \epsilon_h \epsilon_v \sigma_s \sigma_p}$$
$$L = L^{(p)} + L^{(h)} + L^{(v)}\,$$
$$L^{(p)} = \frac{\gamma^2}{\sigma^2_p}\begin{pmatrix}
0 & 0 & 0\\
0 & 1 & 0\\
0 & 0 & 0\end{pmatrix}$$
$$L^{(h)} = \frac{\beta_h}{\epsilon_h}\begin{pmatrix}
1 & -\gamma\phi_h & 0\\
-\gamma\phi_h & \frac{\gamma^2 {\mathcal H}_h}{\beta_h} & 0\\
0 & 0 & 0\end{pmatrix}$$
$$L^{(v)} = \frac{\beta_v}{\epsilon_v}\begin{pmatrix}
0 & 0 & 0\\
0 & \frac{\gamma^2 {\mathcal H}_v}{\beta_v} & -\gamma\phi_v\\
0 & -\gamma\phi_v & 1\end{pmatrix}$$
$${\mathcal H}_{h,v} = [\eta^2_{h,v} + (\beta_{h,v}\eta'_{h,v} - \frac{1}{2}\beta'_{h,v}\eta_h)^2]/\beta_{h,v}$$
$$\phi_{h,v} = \eta'_{h,v} - \frac{1}{2}\beta'_{h,v}\eta_{h,v}/\beta_{h,v}$$

Definitions:

$r_0^2$ is the classical radius of the particle
$c$ is the speed of light
$N$ is the number of particles per bunch
$\beta$ is velocity divided by the speed of light
$\gamma$ is energy divided by mass
$\beta_{h,v}$ and $\beta'_{h,v}$ is the betatron function and its derivative, respectively
$\eta_{h,v}$ and $\eta'_{h,v}$ is the dispersion function and its derivative, respectively
$\epsilon_{h,v}$ is the emittance
$\sigma_s$ is the bunch length
$\sigma_p$ is the momentum spread
$b_{min}$ and $b_{max}$ are the minimum and maximum impact parameters. The minimum impact parameter is the closest distance of approach between two particles in a collision. The maximum impact parameter is the largest distance between two particles such that their trajectories are unaltered by the collision. The maximum impact parameter should be taken to be the minimum beam size. See for some analysis of the Coulomb log and support for this result.
$\theta_{min}$ is the minimum scattering angle.

== Equilibrium and growth rate sum rule ==
IBS can be seen as a process in which the different "temperatures" try to equilibrate. The growth rates would be zero in the case that

- $\frac{\sigma_\delta}{\gamma} = \sigma_{x'} = \sigma_{y'}$

which the factor of $\gamma$ coming from the Lorentz transformation. From this equation, we see that due to the factor of $\gamma$, the longitudinal is typically much "colder" than the transverse. Thus, we typically get growth in the longitudinal, and shrinking in the transverse.

One may also the express conservation of energy in IBS in terms of the Piwinski invariant

- $\frac{\epsilon_x}{\beta_x} + \frac{\epsilon_y}{\beta_y} + \eta_s \frac{\epsilon_z}{\beta_z }$

where $\eta_s = \frac{1}{\gamma^2} -\alpha_c$. Above transition, with just IBS, this implies that there is no equilibrium. However, for the case of radiation damping and diffusion, there is certainly an equilibrium. The effect of IBS is to cause a change in the equilibrium values of the emittances.

== Inclusion of coupling ==
In the case of a coupled beam, one must consider the evolution of the coupled eigenemittances. The growth rates are generalized to $\frac{1}{\tau_{1,2,3}}=\frac{1}{\epsilon_{1,2,3}}\frac{d\epsilon_{1,2,3}}{dt}$

== Measurement and comparison with Theory ==
Intrabeam scattering is an important effect in the proposed "ultimate storage ring" light sources and lepton damping rings for International Linear Collider (ILC) and Compact Linear Collider (CLIC). Experimental studies aimed at understanding intrabeam scattering in beams similar to those used in these types of machines have been conducted at KEK, CesrTA, and elsewhere.
