= ADONE =

High-energy particle collider in Italy

ADONE (big AdA) was a high-energy (beam energy 1.5 GeV, center-of-mass energy 3 GeV) particle collider. It collided electrons with their antiparticles, positrons. It was 105 meters in circumference. It was operated from 1969 to 1993, by the National Institute of Nuclear Physics (INFN) at the Frascati National Laboratory (LNF), in Frascati, Italy.

== See also ==
- ADA collider
- Istituto Nazionale di Fisica Nucleare
- Laboratori Nazionali di Frascati
