= Susumu Okubo =

Japanese physicist

- Born: March 2, 1930; Tokyo, Japan
- Died: July 17, 2015 (aged 85); Rochester, New York, United States
- Education: University of Tokyo; University of Rochester
- Known for: Okubo algebra OZI rule Gell-Mann–Okubo mass formula
- Spouse: Mary Ōkubo
- Children: 2
- Awards: Wigner Medal (2006); Sakurai Prize (2005); Nishina Memorial Prize (1976); Guggenheim Fellowship (1966)
- Scientific career
- Fields: Elementary particle physics
- Workplaces: University of Rochester
- Doctoral advisor: David Feldman

Susumu Okubo (大久保 進, Ōkubo Susumu; 2 March 1930 – July 17, 2015) was a Japanese theoretical physicist at the University of Rochester. Ōkubo worked primarily on elementary particle physics. He is famous for the Gell-Mann–Okubo mass formula for mesons and baryons in the quark model; this formula correctly predicts the relations of masses of the members of SU(3) multiplets in terms of hypercharge and isotopic spin. Ōkubo died in July 2015.

Ōkubo began study at the University of Tokyo in 1949 and received his bachelor's degree there in 1952. He became a graduate student at the University of Rochester in 1954, where he earned his PhD in 1958 with David Feldman as thesis advisor. Afterwards, he was a postdoc in 1959/60 at the University of Naples, in 1960/61 at CERN, and then in 1962 began researching again at the University of Rochester, where he became a professor in 1964 and retired in 1996 as an emeritus professor.

== Awards ==
In 2005 he received the Sakurai Prize from the American Physical Society; "For groundbreaking investigations into the pattern of hadronic masses and decay rates, which provided essential clues into the development of the quark model, and for demonstrating that CP violation permits partial decay rate asymmetries".

In 1976 Ōkubo received the Nishina Memorial Prize in Japan and in 2006 the Wigner Medal. In 1966 he was a Guggenheim Fellow and in 1969 a Ford Fellow. He was a member of the American Physical Society and the American Mathematical Society.

== Works ==
- Introduction to Octonion and Other Non-Associative Algebras in Physics. Cambridge University Press, 1995
- 'Lie Groups and Lie Algebras for Physicists,' with Ashok Das. World Scientific and Hindustan Book Agency, October 2014.
