= Impedance (accelerator physics) =

Degree of self-interaction of a charged particle beam

In accelerator physics, impedance is a quantity that characterizes the self interaction of a charged particle beam, mediated by the beam environment, such as the vacuum chamber, RF cavities, and other elements encountered along the accelerator or storage ring.

== Definition in terms of wakefunction ==
The impedance is defined as the Fourier transform of the Wakefunction.

$Z_0^{||}(\omega) = \int_{-\infty}^{\infty}\frac{dz}{c}e^{-i\omega z/c}W_0^'(z)$

From this expression and the fact that the wake function is real, one can derive the property:

$Z^{*||}(\omega) = Z^{||}(-\omega)$

== Important sources of impedance ==
The impedance is defined at all positions along the beam trajectory. The beam travels through a vacuum chamber. Substantial impedance is generated in transitions, where the shape of the beam pipe changes. The RF cavities are another important source.

== Impedance models ==
In the absence of detailed geometric modeling, one can use various models to represent different aspects of the accelerator beam pipe structure.

One such model is the

=== Broadband resonator ===
For the longitudinal case, one has

$Z_{||}(\omega) = R_s \frac{1-i Q(\frac{\omega_r}{\omega}-\frac{\omega}{\omega_r})}{1+Q^2\left(\frac{\omega_r}{\omega}-\frac{\omega}{\omega_r}\right)^2}$

with $R_s$ the shunt impedance, $Q$, the quality factor, and $\omega_r$ the resonant frequency.

=== Resistive Wall ===
Given a circular beam piper of radius $b$, and conductivity $\sigma$, the impedance is given by

$Z(\omega) = \frac{1-i}{cb}\sqrt{\frac{\omega}{2\pi \sigma}}$

The corresponding longitudinal wakefield is approximately given by

$W(s) = \frac{q}{2\pi b}\sqrt{\frac{c}{\sigma}}\frac{1}{s^{3/2}}$

The transverse wake-function from the resistive wall is given by

$W(s) \approx \frac{1}{s^{1/2}}$

== Effect of Impedance on beam ==
The impedance acts back on the beam and can cause a variety of effects, often considered deleterious for accelerator functioning. In general, impedance effects are classified under the category of "collective effects" due to the fact that the whole beam must be considered together, and not just a single particle. The whole beam may, however, cause particular changes in the dynamics of individual particles such as tune shifts and coupling. Whole beam changes include emittance growth and instabilities that can lead to beam loss.

== See also ==
https://impedance.web.cern.ch/impedance/
