= George Zweig =

American physicist (born 1936)

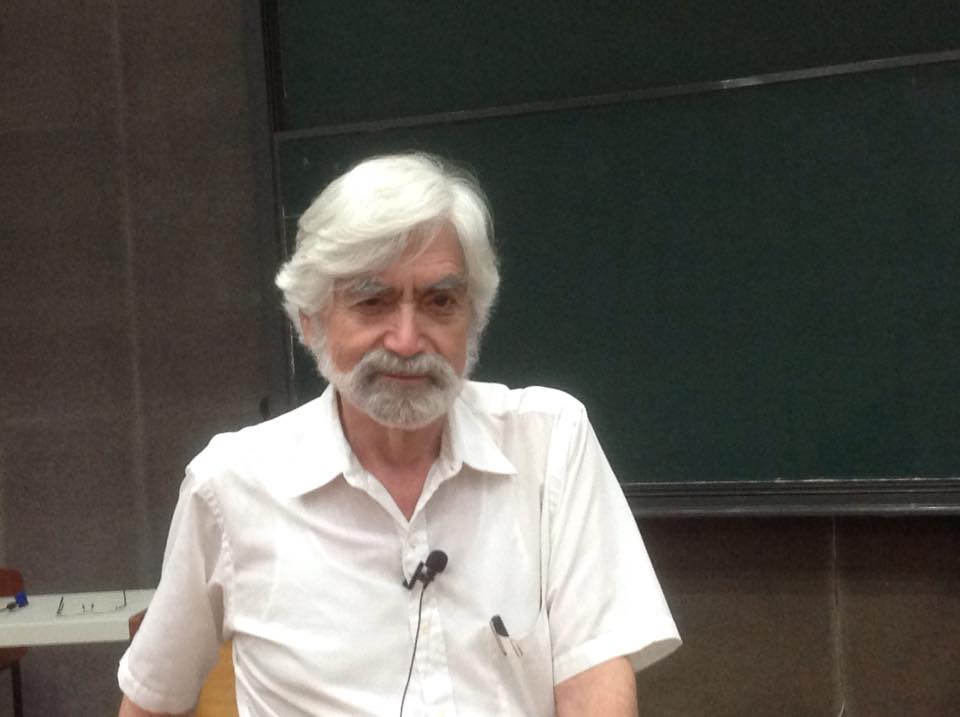
- George Zweig giving a speech at Department of Physics, National Taiwan University
- Born: May 30, 1937 (age 89); Moscow, Russian SFSR, Soviet Union (now Russia)
- Citizenship: American
- Education: University of Michigan; California Institute of Technology
- Known for: Quark model
- Awards: Sakurai Prize (2015); MacArthur Fellowship (1981); Member of the National Academy of Sciences (1996)
- Scientific career
- Fields: Physics; neurobiology
- Workplaces: Los Alamos National Laboratory, Massachusetts Institute of Technology
- Doctoral advisor: Richard Feynman

George Zweig (/zwaɪɡ/; born May 30, 1937) is an American physicist of Russian-Jewish origin. He was trained as a particle physicist under Richard Feynman. He introduced, independently of Murray Gell-Mann, the quark model (although he named it "aces"). He later turned his attention to neurobiology. He has worked as a research scientist at Los Alamos National Laboratory and Massachusetts Institute of Technology, and in the financial services industry.

== Early life and education ==
Zweig was born on May 30, 1937 in Moscow, Russian SFSR, Soviet Union, into a Jewish family. His father was a structural engineer. He graduated from the University of Michigan in 1959 with a bachelor's degree in mathematics, having taken numerous physics courses as electives. He earned a PhD degree in theoretical physics at the California Institute of Technology in 1964.

== Career ==
Zweig proposed the existence of quarks at CERN, independently of Murray Gell-Mann, shortly after defending his PhD dissertation. Zweig dubbed them "aces", after the four playing cards, because he speculated there were four of them (on the basis of the four extant leptons known at the time). The introduction of the concept of quarks provided a cornerstone for particle physics.

Like Gell-Mann, he realized that several important properties of particles such as baryons (e.g., protons and neutrons) could be explained by treating them as triplets of other constituent particles, with fractional baryon number and electric charge. Unlike Gell-Mann, Zweig was partly led to his picture of the quark model by the peculiarly attenuated decays of the φ meson to ρ π, a feature codified by what is now known as the OZI Rule, the "Z" in which stands for "Zweig". In subsequent technical terminology, ultimately Gell-Mann's quarks were closer to "current quarks", while Zweig's to "constituent quarks". Zweig encountered considerable resistance to his proposal, as he later recalled in an invited talk at the 1980 International Conference on Baryon Resonances in Toronto:

The reaction of the theoretical physics community to the ace model was generally not benign. Getting the CERN report published in the form that I wanted was so difficult that I finally gave up trying. When the physics department of a leading University was considering an appointment for me, their senior theorist, one of the most respected spokesmen for all of theoretical physics, blocked the appointment at a faculty meeting by passionately arguing that the ace model was the work of a "charlatan." The idea that hadrons, citizens of a nuclear democracy, were made of elementary particles with fractional quantum numbers did seem a bit rich. This idea, however, is apparently correct.

— George Zweig, Origins of the Quark Model

Gell-Mann received the Nobel Prize for physics in 1969, for his overall contributions and discoveries concerning the classification of elementary particles and their interactions; at that time, quark theory had not become fully accepted, and was not specifically mentioned in the official citation of the prize. In 1977 Richard Feynman nominated both Zweig, and Gell-Mann again, for the Nobel prize, but the nomination failed.

Zweig later turned to research on hearing and neurobiology, and studied the transduction of sound into nerve impulses in the cochlea of the human ear, and how the brain maps sound onto the spatial dimensions of the cerebral cortex. In 1975, while studying the ear, he introduced a version of the continuous wavelet transform, the cochlear transform.

In 2003, Zweig joined the quantitative hedge fund Renaissance Technologies, founded by the former Cold War code breaker James Simons. He left the firm in 2010. Once his four-year confidentiality agreement with Renaissance Technologies expired, the 78-year-old Zweig returned to Wall Street and co-founded a quantitative hedge fund, called Signition, with two younger partners. They began trading in 2015.

== Awards and honors ==
- MacArthur Prize Fellowship (1981)
- National Academy of Sciences (1996)
- Sakurai Prize (2015)
