= Istituto Nazionale di Fisica Nucleare =

Italian research institute

- Location: Rome, Italy
- Website: www.infn.it

The Istituto Nazionale di Fisica Nucleare (INFN; "National Institute for Nuclear Physics") is the coordinating institution for nuclear, particle, theoretical and astroparticle physics in Italy.

== History ==
The Istituto Nazionale di Fisica Nuclear (INFN) was founded on 8 August 1951 to further the nuclear physics research tradition initiated by Enrico Fermi in Rome in the 1930s.

During the latter half of the 1950s, the INFN designed and constructed the first Italian electron accelerator—the electron synchrotron developed in Frascati.

In the early 1960s, it also constructed in Frascati the first ever electron-positron collider (ADA - Anello Di Accumulazione), under the scientific leadership of Bruno Touschek. In 1968, Frascati began operating ADONE (big AdA), which was the first high-energy particle collider, having a beam energy of 1.5 GeV. During the same period, the INFN began to participate in research into the construction and use of ever-more powerful accelerators being conducted at CERN.

== Description ==
The INFN collaborates with CERN, Fermilab, and various other laboratories in the world. In recent years it has provided important contributions to grid computing.

The INFN has Sezioni (Divisions) in most major Italian universities and four national laboratories. It has personnel of its own, but it is mostly the main funding agency for high-energy physics in Italy. University personnel can be affiliated with INFN and receive from it research grants.

== Asimov Prize ==
The Asimov Prize is a literary-scientific award organised by the INFN in collaboration with the Gran Sasso Science Institute graduate school.

== Laboratories ==
- Laboratori Nazionali del Gran Sasso, situated near the Gran Sasso mountain
- Laboratori Nazionali di Legnaro, in Legnaro
- Laboratori Nazionali di Frascati, in Frascati
- Laboratori Nazionali del Sud, in Catania

== Divisions ==
- Bari
- Bologna
- Bologna - CNAF
- Cagliari
- Catania
- Ferrara
- Firenze
- Firenze - GGI
- Genova
- Lecce
- Milano
- Milano - Bicocca
- Napoli
- Padova
- Pavia
- Perugia
- Pisa
- Roma
- Roma - II
- Roma - III
- Torino
- Trento - TIFPA
- Trieste

== Presidents ==
- 1954-1959 Gilberto Bernardini (it)
- 1960-1965 Edoardo Amaldi
- 1966-1970 Giorgio Salvini
- 1970-1975 Claudio Villi (it)
- 1976-1977 Alberto Gigli Berzolari
- 1977-1983 Antonino Zichichi
- 1983-1992 Nicola Cabibbo
- 1993-1998 Luciano Maiani
- 1998-2004 Enzo Iarocci
- 2004–2011 Roberto Petronzio
- 2011–2019 Fernando Ferroni
- 2019–current Antonio Zoccoli

== See also ==
- AURIGA: a gravitational wave experiment
- European Gravitational Observatory, a collaboration with CNRS of France
- FLUKA
- The INFN Grid Project: INFN involvement in grid computing
- Møller scattering
- Touschek effect – an effect first observed in ADA and explained by Bruno Touschek (after whom it is now named), whereby the beam lifetime of storage rings is reduced due to loss of the colliding particles from scattering.
