= Touschek effect =

The Touschek effect describes the scattering and loss of charged particles in a storage ring. It was discovered by Bruno Touschek.

It is determined by the average of the scattering rate around the ring

$$\frac{1}{\tau} = \frac{1}{C}\oint \frac{1}{\tau_l}(s) \, ds$$

In fact, since the momentum acceptance for scattering with energy gain may be different from that for scattering with energy loss, the lifetime must be computed by taking into account the positive and negative momentum acceptances, i.e.

$$\frac{1}{\tau} = \frac{1}{2}\left(\frac{1}{\tau_+} + \frac{1}{\tau_-}\right)$$

A formula for the local scattering rate, given by Bruck, is

$$\frac{1}{\tau_l}(s) = \frac{r_0^2 c N}{8\pi\gamma^2\sigma_x\sigma_y\sigma_z\delta_\mathrm{acc}^3}F(\varepsilon_m).$$

Here, $r_0$ is the classical particle radius, c is the speed of light, N is the number of particles, $\gamma$ is the relativistic gamma factor, $\delta_\mathrm{acc}$ is the momentum acceptance, $\sigma_{x,y,z}$ are the RMS horizontal, vertical, and bunch sizes, respectively.

$$\varepsilon_m = \left(\frac{\delta_\mathrm{acc}}{\gamma\sigma_{x'}}\right)^2$$

where the function F is given by

$$F(\varepsilon)=\frac{\sqrt{\varepsilon}}{2}\int_0^1 \left( \frac{2}{u} - \ln\left(\frac{1}{u}\right)-2\right)e^{-\frac{\varepsilon}{u}} \, du$$

A more accurate formula, valid in a wider range of conditions is derived by Piwinski.

== Momentum acceptance calculation ==
The standard procedure for computing the momentum acceptance via a tracking code was defined in the paper by Belgroune et al. from the SOLEIL synchrotron.

== Calculation in beam dynamics codes ==
In order to compute the Touschek lifetime for a real storage ring, one needs a beam dynamics code. The Piwinski formula may be used together with the Elegant code for example.
