= Charm quark =

Type of quark

- Composition: Elementary particle
- Statistics: Fermion
- Family: Quark
- Generation: Second
- Interactions: strong, electromagnetic, weak, gravity
- Symbol: c
- Antiparticle: Charm antiquark (c̅)
- Theorized: James Bjorken, Sheldon Glashow (1964); Sheldon Glashow, John Iliopoulos, Luciano Maiani (1970)
- Discovered: Samuel C. C. Ting et al. (BNL, 1974); Burton Richter et al. (SLAC, 1974)
- Mass: 1.27±0.02 GeV/c^{2}
- Electric charge: +2/3 e
- Color charge: Yes
- Spin: 1/2 ħ
- Weak isospin: LH: +1/2, RH: 0
- Weak hypercharge: LH: +1/3, RH: +4/3

The charm quark, charmed quark, or c quark is an elementary particle found in composite subatomic particles called hadrons such as the J/psi meson and the charmed baryons created in particle accelerator collisions. Several bosons, including the W and Z bosons and the Higgs boson, can decay into charm quarks. All charm quarks carry charm, a quantum number. This second-generation particle is the third-most-massive quark, with a mass of 1.27±0.02 GeV/c^{2} as measured in 2022, and a charge of +2/3 e.

The existence of the charm quark was first predicted by James Bjorken and Sheldon Glashow in 1964, and in 1970, Glashow, John Iliopoulos, and Luciano Maiani showed how its existence would account for experimental and theoretical discrepancies. In 1974, its existence was confirmed through the independent discoveries of the J/psi meson at Brookhaven National Laboratory and the Stanford Linear Accelerator Center. In the next few years, several other charmed particles, including the D meson and the charmed strange mesons, were found.

In the 21st century, a baryon containing two charm quarks has been found. There is recent evidence that intrinsic charm quarks exist in the proton, and the coupling of the charm quark and the Higgs boson has been studied. Recent evidence also indicates CP violation in the decay of the D^{0} meson, which contains the charm quark.

== Naming ==
According to Sheldon Glashow, the charm quark received its name because of the "symmetry it brought to the subnuclear world". Glashow also justified the name as "a magical device to avert evil", because adding the charm quark would prohibit unwanted and unseen decays in the three-quark theory at the time. The charm quark is also called the "charmed quark" in both academic and non-academic contexts. The symbol of the charm quark is "c".

== History ==
=== Background ===
In 1961, Murray Gell-Mann introduced the Eightfold Way as a pattern to group baryons and mesons. In 1964, Gell-Mann and George Zweig independently proposed that all hadrons are composed of elementary constituents, which Gell-Mann called "quarks". Initially, only the up quark, the down quark, and the strange quark were proposed. These quarks would produce all of the particles in the Eightfold Way. Gell-Mann and Kazuhiko Nishijima had established strangeness, a quantum number, in 1953 to describe processes involving strange particles such as Σ and Λ.

=== Theoretical prediction ===
The GIM mechanism explains the rarity of the decay of a K̅^{0} into two muons by involving the charm quark (c) in the process.

In 1964, James Bjorken and Sheldon Glashow theorized "charm" as a new quantum number. At the time, there were four known leptons—the electron, the muon, and each of their neutrinos—but Gell-Mann initially proposed only three quarks. Bjorken and Glashow thus hoped to establish parallels between the leptons and the quarks with their theory. According to Glashow, the conjecture came from "aesthetic arguments".

In 1970, Glashow, John Iliopoulos, and Luciano Maiani proposed a new quark that differed from the three then-known quarks by the charm quantum number. They further predicted the existence of "charmed particles" and offered suggestions on how to experimentally produce them. They also suggested the charmed quark could provide a mechanism—the GIM mechanism—to facilitate the unification of the weak and electromagnetic forces.

At the Conference on Experimental Meson Spectroscopy (EMS) in April 1974, Glashow delivered his paper titled "Charm: An Invention Awaits Discovery". Glashow asserted because neutral currents were likely to exist, a fourth quark was "sorely needed" to explain the rarity of the decays of certain kaons. He also made several predictions on the properties of charm quarks. He wagered that, by the next EMS conference in 1976:

There are just three possibilities:

1. Charm is not found, and I eat my hat.
2. Charm is found by hadron spectroscopers, and we celebrate.
3. Charm is found by outlanders, (Note: According to Riordan, the word "outlanders" means "other kinds of physicists who did neutrino scattering or measured electron–positron collisions in storage rings.") and you eat your hats.

In July 1974, at the 17th International Conference on High Energy Physics (ICHEP), Iliopoulos said:

I have won already several bottles of wine by betting for the neutral currents and I am ready to bet now a whole case that if the weak interaction sessions of this Conference were dominated by the discovery of the neutral currents, the entire next Conference will be dominated by the discovery of the charmed particles.

Applying an argument of naturalness to the kaon mass splitting between the K^{0}_{L} and K^{0}_{S} states, the mass of the charm quark was estimated by Mary K. Gaillard and Benjamin W. Lee in 1974 to be less than 5 GeV/c^{2}.

=== Discovery ===
Glashow predicted that the down quark of a proton could absorb a W^{+} and become a charm quark. Then, the proton would be transformed into a charmed baryon before it decayed into several particles, including a lambda baryon. In late May 1974, Robert Palmer and Nicholas P. Samios found an event generating a lambda baryon from their bubble chamber at Brookhaven National Laboratory. It took months for Palmer to be convinced the lambda baryon came from a charmed particle. When the magnet of the bubble chamber failed in October 1974, they did not encounter the same event. The two scientists published their observations in early 1975. Michael Riordan commented that this event was "ambiguous" and "encouraging but not convincing evidence".

==== J/psi meson (1974) ====
In 1974, Samuel C. C. Ting was searching for charmed particles at Brookhaven National Laboratory (BNL). His team was using an electron-pair detector. By the end of August, they found a peak at 3.1 GeV/c^{2} and the signal's width was less than 5 MeV. The team was eventually convinced they had observed a massive particle and named it "J". Ting considered announcing his discovery in October 1974, but postponed the announcement due to his concern about the μ/π ratio.

At the Stanford Linear Accelerator Center (SLAC), Burton Richter's team performed experiments on 9–10 November 1974. They also found a high probability of interaction at 3.1 GeV/c^{2}. They called the particle "psi". On 11 November 1974, Richter met Ting at the SLAC, and they announced their discovery.

Theorists immediately began to analyze the new particle. It was shown to have a lifetime on the scale of 10^{−20} seconds, suggesting special characteristics. Thomas Appelquist and David Politzer suggested that the particle was composed of a charm quark and a charm antiquark whose spins were aligned in parallel. The two called this configuration "charmonium". Charmonium would have two forms: "orthocharmonium", where the spins of the two quarks are parallel, and "paracharmonium", where the spins align oppositely. Murray Gell-Mann also believed in the idea of charmonium. Some other theorists, such as Richard Feynman, initially thought the new particle consisted of an up quark with a charm antiquark.

On 15 November 1974, Ting and Richter issued a press release about their discovery. On 21 November at the SLAC, SPEAR found a resonance of the J/psi particle at 3.7 GeV/c^{2} as Martin Breidenbach and Terence Goldman had predicted. This particle was called ψ′ ("psi-prime"). In late November, Appelquist and Politzer published their paper theorizing charmonium. Glashow and Alvaro De Rujula also published a paper called "Is Bound Charm Found?", in which they used the charm quark and asymptotic freedom to explain the properties of the J/psi meson.

Eventually, on 2 December 1974, Physical Review Letters (PRL) published the discovery papers of J and psi, by Ting and Richter respectively. The discovery of the psi-prime was published the following week. Then, on 6 January 1975, PRL published nine theoretical papers on the J/psi particle; according to Michael Riordan, five of them "promoted the charm hypothesis and its variations". In 1976, Ting and Richter shared the Nobel Prize in Physics for their discovery "of a heavy elementary particle of the new kind".

In August 1976, in The New York Times, Glashow recalled his wager and commented, "John [Iliopoulos]'s wine and my hat had been saved in the nick of time". At the next EMS conference, spectroscopists ate Mexican candy hats supplied by the organizers. Frank Close wrote a Nature article titled "Iliopoulos won his bet" in the same year, saying the 18th ICHEP was "indeed dominated by that very discovery". No-one paid off their bets to Iliopoulos.

==== Other charmed particles (1975–1977) ====
In April 1975, E. G. Cazzoli et al., including Palmer and Samios, published their earlier ambiguous evidence for the charmed baryon. By the time of the Lepton–Photon Symposium in August 1975, eight new heavy particles had been discovered. These particles, however, have zero total charm. Starting from the fourth quarter of that year, physicists began to look for particles with a net, or "naked", charm.

On 3 May 1976 at SLAC, Gerson Goldhaber and François Pierre identified a 1.87 GeV/c^{2} peak, which suggested the presence of a neutral charmed D meson according to Glashow's prediction. On 5 May, Goldhaber and Pierre published a joint memorandum about their discovery of the "naked charm". By the time of the 18th International Conference on High Energy Physics, more charmed particles had been discovered. Riordan said "solid evidence for charm surfaced in session after session" at the conference, confirming the existence of the charm quark. The charmed strange meson was discovered in 1977.

=== Later and current research ===
In 2002, the SELEX Collaboration at Fermilab published the first observation of the doubly charmed baryon Ξ^{+}_{cc} ("double charmed xi+"). It is a three-quark particle containing two charm quarks. The team found doubly charmed baryons with an up quark are more massive and have a higher rate of production than those with a down quark.

In 2007, the BaBar and Belle collaborations each reported evidence for the mixing of two neutral charmed mesons, D^{0} and D̅^{0}. The evidence confirmed the mixing rate is small, as is predicted by the Standard Model. Neither studies found evidence for CP violation between the decays of the two charmed particles.

In 2022, the NNPDF Collaboration found evidence for the existence of intrinsic charm quarks in the proton. In the same year, physicists also conducted a direct search for Higgs boson decays into charm quarks using the ATLAS detector of the Large Hadron Collider. They have determined that the Higgs–charm coupling is weaker than the Higgs–bottom coupling. On 7 July 2022, the LHCb experiment announced they had found evidence of direct CP violation in the decay of the D^{0} meson into pions.

== Characteristics ==
The charm quark is a second-generation up-type quark. It carries charm, a quantum number. According to the 2022 Particle Physics Review, the charmed quark has a mass of 1.27±0.02 GeV/c^{2}, (Note: The Particle Physics Review uses the unit GeV instead of GeV/c^{2}. This is because particle physics uses natural units, in which the speed of light is set to be one. The Review also notes this mass corresponds to the "running" mass in the minimal subtraction scheme (MS scheme).) a charge of +2/3 e, and a charm of +1. The charm quark is more massive than the strange quark: the ratio between the masses of the two is about 11.76+0.05
−0.10.

The CKM matrix describes the weak interaction of quarks. As of 2022, the values of the CKM matrix relating to the charm quark are:
$$\begin{align}
|V_\text{cd}| & = 0.221 \pm 0.004 \\
|V_\text{cs}| & = 0.975 \pm 0.006 \\
|V_\text{cb}| & = 0.0408 \pm 0.0014
\end{align}$$

A supermultiplet of baryons that contain the up, down, strange and charm quarks with half-spin

Charm quarks can exist in either "open charm particles", which contain one or several charm quarks, or as charmonium states, which are bound states of a charm quark and a charm antiquark. There are several charmed mesons, including D^{±} and D^{0}. Charmed baryons include Λ_{c}, Σ_{c}, Ξ_{c}, Ω_{c}, with various charges and resonances.

=== Production and decay ===
Particles containing charm quarks can be produced via electron–positron collisions or in hadron collisions. Using different energies, electron–positron colliders can produce psi or upsilon mesons. Hadron colliders produce particles that contain charm quarks at a higher cross section. (Note: According to Mark Thomson, a cross section in particle physics is a measure of quantum mechanical probability for the interaction. It is the ratio between the interaction rate per target particle and the incident particle flux.) The W boson can also decay into hadrons containing the charm quark or the charm antiquark. The Z boson can decay into charmonium through charm quark fragmentation. The Higgs boson can also decay to J/ψ or η_{c} through the same mechanism. The decay rate of the Higgs boson into charmonium is "governed by the charm-quark Yukawa coupling".

The charm quark can decay into other quarks via weak decays. The charm quark also annihilates with the charm antiquark during the decays of ground-state charmonium mesons.
