= Florencia Canelli =

Swiss scientific delegate to the CERN council

Prof. Dr. Florencia Canelli
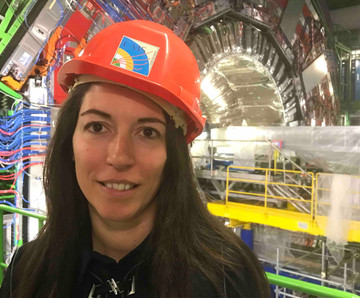
- Born: 1973 (age 52–53); Buenos Aires, Argentina
- Citizenship: Argentina, Italy, United States
- Employer: University of Zurich
- Title: Swiss scientific delegate to the CERN council
- Awards: 2010 IUPAP award for particle physics
- Website: https://www.physik.uzh.ch/~canelli/

Florencia Canelli is since 2021 the appointed Swiss scientific delegate to the CERN council, the supreme decision-making authority of the CERN Organization. From 2021-2024, she was appointed chair of the IUPAP division of particles and field (C11). From 2021-2023, she was co-coordinator of the physics program of the CMS collaboration, a CERN experiment with over 3000 physicists. In 2010, Canelli was awarded the IUPAP Young scientist prize, an international prize awarded to one experimental and one theoretical physicist per year, for "her pioneering contribution to the identification and precision measurements of rare phenomenon through the use of advanced analysis techniques to separate very small signals from large background processes at the Tevatron collider." She has been an author on four multi-purpose collider experiments, namely the CMS experiment and ATLAS experiment at the CERN LHC, and the CDF experiment and D0 experiment at the Fermilab Tevatron. She is currently a full professor at the University of Zurich, Physics Institute, specializing in particle physics.

== Early life and education ==
Florencia Canelli was born in Buenos Aires, Argentina, in 1973. At a young age, her family moved to Asuncion, Paraguay, where she received much of her education. After receiving the equivalent of a physics bachelor degree at the Universidad Nacional de Asunción (Paraguay), she continued her education at the Instituto Balseiro in Bariloche, Argentina, before beginning her PhD studies in particle physics at the University of Rochester in the U.S. under the supervision of Tom Ferbel. Her PhD thesis, studying the properties of the top quark with data from the D0 experiment, introduced the so-called "matrix element" technique to improve measurements from collider detectors, and won several awards for this work, including the Mitsuyoshi Tanaka Dissertation Award, from APS.

== Career ==
After her PhD, she became a postdoc at UCLA on the CDF experiment at Fermilab from 2003-2006. During this time, she led efforts to estimate the energy scale of quarks produced in collisions, significantly contributing to the experiment's results and improving the precision of numerous measurements.

In 2006, she accepted a prestigious Wilson Fellow at Fermilab. During her tenure as convener of the CDF top-quark group, the group made the first observation of the single production of top quarks.

In 2008, she became an assistant professor at the University of Chicago, and began her involvement on the ATLAS experiment at CERN, while continuing on the CDF experiment. She was awarded the Sloan Research Fellowship in 2009. In 2009, she was promoted to Scientist 1 at Fermilab, and in 2011, was promoted to associate professor at University of Chicago.

Canelli was part of the team at CDF that found evidence for the Higgs boson in 2012, as well as the ATLAS team that co-discovered the Higgs boson at the LHC on July 4th, 2012.

In 2012, Canelli moved to Switzerland, becoming associate professor at the University of Zurich, and later joining the CMS experiment. Her group has helped construct the CMS barrel pixel detector, installed in 2017, and studied a wide range of physics processes related to the Higgs boson, top quark, and beyond the Standard Model. She has co-led the CMS top quark group, and from 2021-2023 was the co-coordinator of the entire CMS physics program.

Canelli has been appointed to several high-level positions in international bodies, serving as chair of the Particles and fields commission (C11) of the International Union of Pure and Applied Physics from 2021-2024, and as Swiss scientific delegate to the CERN council since 2021.

In 2025, Canelli was elected as a fellow of the American Physical Society, "for distinguished leadership in physics at the Large Hadron Collider at CERN and for significant contributions to the study of the top quark at the Large Hadron Collider and at the Tevatron at Fermilab".

== Published works ==
Canelli has over 1700 publications, mainly on the CMS, ATLAS, CDF and D0 experiments.

== Personal life ==
Canelli is married to experimental particle physicist, Prof. Ben Kilminster. They have two children.

== Recognition ==
- 2010: IUPAP Young Scientist Prize
- 2009: Alfred P. Sloan Fellowship
- 2006: Wilson Fellowship
- 2005: Mitsuyoshi Tanaka Dissertation Award, APS
- 2004: University Research Association Thesis Award, Fermilab
- 2004: Frederick Lobkowicz Thesis Prize, University of Rochester

== Leadership in international organizations ==
- since 2022: Swiss scientific delegate to CERN Council, Vice-President of the Council as of 2025
- 2021-2024: Chair of the commission Particles and Fields (C11) of IUPAP
- 2017-2020: Member of Fermilab Physics Advisory Committee (PAC)
- 2017-2021: Secretary of the commission Particles and Fields (C11) of IUPAP
- 2014-2017: Regular member of the commission Particles and Fields (C11) of IUPAP
- 2013-2021: Swiss representative to the CMS management board
- 2016-2019: Swiss representative to the Cherenkov Telescope Array Council

== Leadership in experimental collaborations ==
- 2021-2023: Physics co-coordinator for the CMS experiment
- 2018-2020: Convener of the CMS top-quark group
- 2015-2016: Convener of the CMS "Very Heavy Fermions" (VFS) group
- 2007-2009: Convener of the CDF top-quark group
- 2005-2007: Convener of the CDF top-quark mass group
- 2003-2004: Convener of the CDF jet-energy and resolution group
