= Ursula Bassler =

Scientist

Ursula Rita Bassler
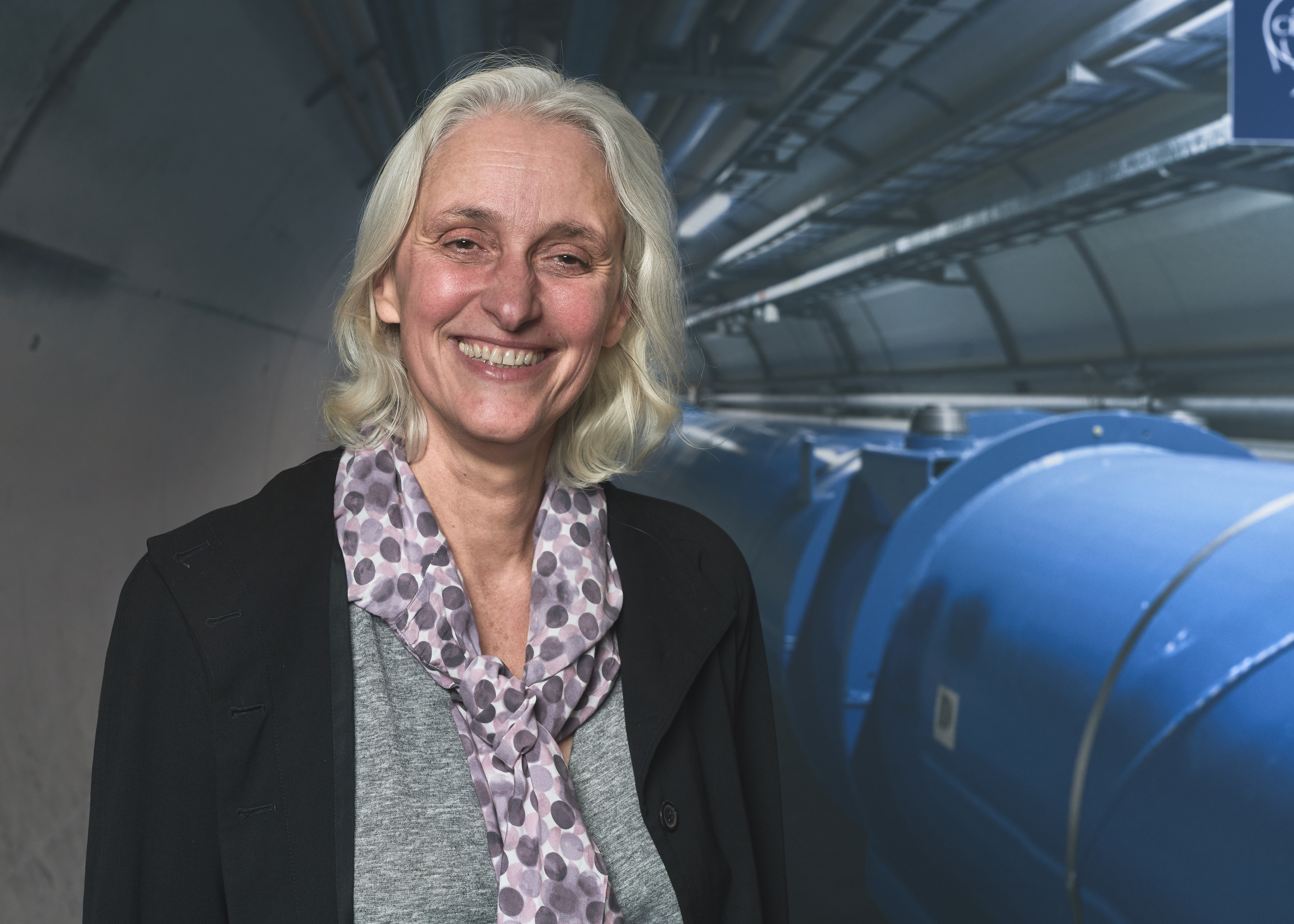
- Born: 1965 (age 60–61)
- Education: Pierre and Marie Curie University (Ph.D. particle physics)
- Scientific career
- Workplaces: Institut national de physique nucléaire et de physique des particules; CERN

Ursula Rita Bassler (born 1965) is a French-German particle physicist. Bassler was the President of the CERN Council from 2019 to 2021, and deputy director of National Institute of Nuclear and Particle Physics (IN2P3), CNRS, from 2014 to 2015. From 2026 on, she serves as CERN's Director for Stakeholder Relations.

== Early life and education ==
Bassler was born in Germany in 1965. She moved to France as an au-pair. She completed her PhD in particle physics at the Pierre and Marie Curie University in 1993.

== Research and career ==
She joined the Nuclear and High Energy Laboratory (LPNHE), a joint research unit between the Centre national de la recherche scientifique (CNRS) and Pierre and Marie Curie University, where she worked on collider-based particle physics. Bassler used data from the HERA particle accelerator, where she worked on the structure of the proton as a member of the H1 experiment at DESY in Germany.

In 1998 Bassler joined the DØ experiment at Fermilab, where her responsibility was to run the online calorimeter calibration. She was part of a working group on structure function providing input to the Deep Inelastic Scattering Workshop in 1999.

During the World Year of Physics in 2005, Bassler kept a blog at Quantum Diaries. In 2006, she created the project Collisions, a multi-media project with Anaïs Prosaïc as director, which featured the physicists and engineers who work for the Large Hadron Collider. Bassler and Prosaïc made the documentary Collisions in 2008.

In 2007 she was made Head of the Particle Physics division at the Institute of Research of the Fundamental Laws of the Universe at the French Alternative Energies and Atomic Energy Commission (CEA).

She was scientific deputy director in particle physics and computing at IN2P3 (2014-2015), before becoming its deputy director (2016-2018). At IN2P3, Bassler prepared the approval of the upgrades for the high-luminosity LHC (HL-LHC) detectors and the French participation in the European Open Science Cloud.

She has been member of the DESY scientific council.

In September 2018 Bassler was made the 23rd President of CERN Council. Her candidacy was proposed by France and Germany.

As of August 2024, Bassler is affiliated with Laboratoire Leprince-Ringuet at École Polytechnique as CNRS researcher.

In June 2025, the CERN Council elected her as Director of Stakeholder Relations, following the nomination by then-Director-General Designate, Mark Thomson.

Bassler has published more than 500 peer reviewed papers and she is editor of the popular science book Étonnants infinis.
