= Sheldon Glashow =

American theoretical physicist

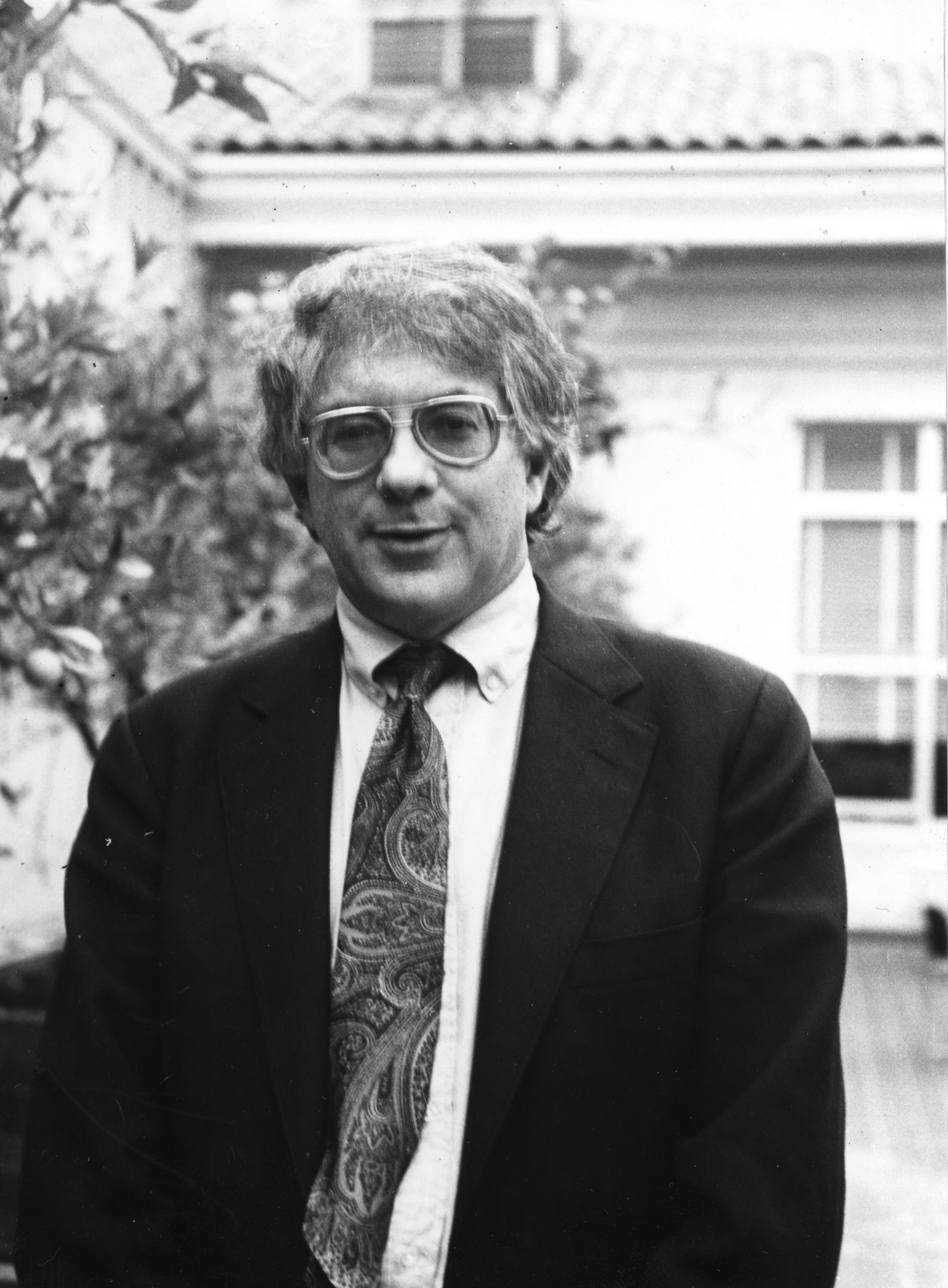
- Glashow in c. 1980
- Born: December 5, 1932 (age 93); New York City, New York, U.S.
- Education: Cornell University (AB, 1954); Harvard University (PhD, 1959)
- Known for: Electroweak theory Georgi–Glashow model GIM mechanism Glashow resonance De Rujula-Georgi-Glashow quark model Chiral color Very special relativity Trinification; Weak hypercharge Weak mixing angle Criticism of Superstring theory
- Spouse: Joan Shirley Alexander (m. 1972)
- Children: 4
- Awards: Oskar Klein Memorial Lecture (2017); Richtmyer Memorial Award (1994); Nobel Prize in Physics (1979); J. Robert Oppenheimer Memorial Prize (1977); Sloan Fellowship (1962)
- Scientific career
- Fields: Theoretical Physics
- Workplaces: Boston University; Harvard University; Texas A&M University; California Institute of Technology; Stanford University; University of California, Berkeley
- Thesis: The vector meson in elementary particle decays (1958)
- Doctoral advisor: Julian Schwinger
- Doctoral students: Andrew Yao

Sheldon Lee Glashow (US: /ˈɡlæʃoʊ/, UK: /ˈɡlæʃaʊ/; born December 5, 1932) is an American theoretical physicist. He shared the 1979 Nobel Prize in Physics with Abdus Salam and Steven Weinberg "for their contributions to the theory of the unified weak and electromagnetic interaction between elementary particles, including, inter alia, the prediction of the weak neutral current". He is the Metcalf Professor of Mathematics and Physics at Boston University and a Eugene Higgins Professor of Physics, emeritus, at Harvard University. Glashow is a member of the board of sponsors for the Bulletin of the Atomic Scientists.

== Birth and education ==
Sheldon Glashow was born on December 5, 1932, in New York City, to Jewish immigrants from Russia, Bella (née Rubin) and Lewis Gluchovsky, a plumber. He graduated from Bronx High School of Science in 1950. Glashow was in the same graduating class as Steven Weinberg, whose own research, independent of Glashow's, led to Glashow, Weinberg, and Abdus Salam sharing the 1979 Nobel Prize in Physics. Glashow received a Bachelor of Arts degree from Cornell University in 1954 and a PhD degree in physics from Harvard University in 1959 under Nobel-laureate physicist Julian Schwinger. Afterward, he became a NSF fellow at NORDITA and met Murray Gell-Mann, who convinced him to become a research fellow at the California Institute of Technology. Glashow then became an assistant professor at Stanford University before joining the University of California, Berkeley, where he was an associate professor from 1962 to 1966. He joined Harvard's physics department as a professor in 1966, and was named Eugene Higgins Professor of Physics in 1979; he became emeritus in 2000. Glashow has been a visiting scientist at CERN and a professor at Aix-Marseille University, MIT, Brookhaven Laboratory, Texas A&M, the University of Houston, and Boston University.

== Research ==
In 1961, Glashow extended electroweak unification models due to Julian Schwinger by including a short range neutral current, the Z^{0}. The resulting symmetry structure that he proposed, SU(2) × U(1), forms the basis of the accepted theory of the electroweak interactions. For this discovery, Glashow, Steven Weinberg, and Abdus Salam, won the 1979 Nobel Prize in Physics.

In collaboration with James Bjorken, Glashow was the first to predict a fourth quark, the charm quark, in 1964. At the time, four leptons had been discovered but only three quarks proposed. In 1970, Bjorken and Glashow developed the GIM mechanism, which showed that the quark pairs (d.s) and (u,c) would largely cancel out flavor-changing neutral currents, which had been observed experimentally at far lower levels than theoretically predicted on the basis of only three quarks. The charm quark also removed a technical disaster for any quantum field theory with unequal numbers of quarks and leptons—an anomaly—where classical field theory symmetries fail to carry over into quantum theory.

In 1973, Glashow and Howard Georgi proposed the first Grand Unified Theory. They discovered how to fit the gauge forces in the Standard Model into an SU(5) Lie group, and the quarks and leptons into two simple representations. Their theory qualitatively predicted the general pattern of coupling constant running, with plausible assumptions. It gave rough mass ratio values between third-generation leptons and quarks and was the first indication that the law of Baryon number is inexact and the proton is unstable. This work was the foundation for all future unifying work.

Glashow shared the 1977 J. Robert Oppenheimer Memorial Prize with Feza Gürsey.

== Criticism of superstring theory ==
Glashow is a skeptic of superstring theory due to its lack of experimentally testable predictions. He campaigned to keep string theorists out of Harvard's physics department. About ten minutes into "String's the Thing", the second episode of the TV series The Elegant Universe, Glashow calls superstring theory a discipline distinct from physics, saying, "you may call it a tumor, if you will".

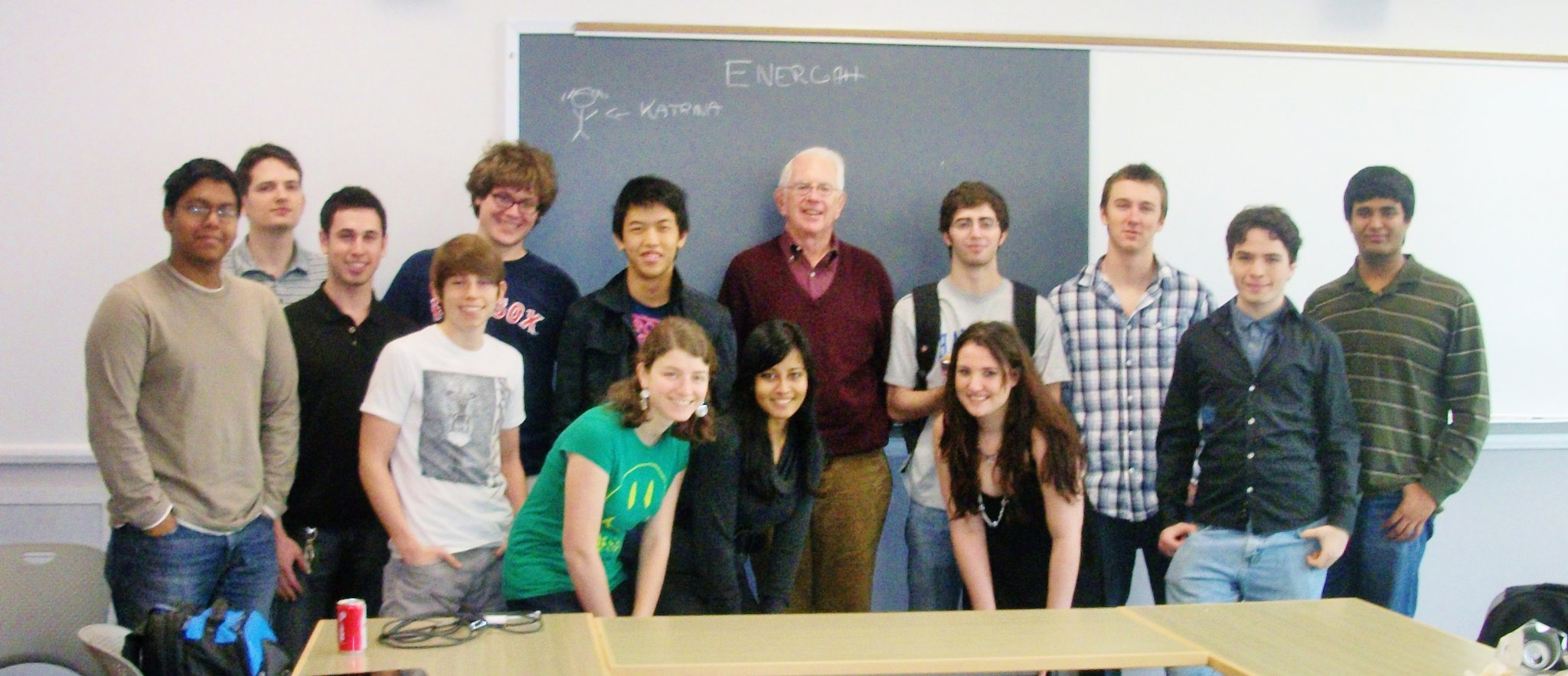
Professor Glashow's KHC PY 101 Energy class, at Boston University's Kilachand Honors College (Spring 2011)

== Personal life ==
Glashow is married to Joan Shirley Alexander. They have four children. Lynn Margulis, who was married to Carl Sagan, was Joan's sister. Daniel Kleitman, another doctoral student of Julian Schwinger, is Glashow's brother-in-law through Joan's other sister, Sharon.

In 2003, Glashow was one of 22 Nobel laureates who signed the Humanist Manifesto. He has called himself a "practicing atheist" and a Democrat.

Glashow is one of the 20 American recipients of the Nobel Prize in Physics who signed a letter addressed to President George W. Bush in May 2008 urging him to "reverse the damage done to basic science research in the Fiscal Year 2008 Omnibus Appropriations Bill" by requesting additional emergency funding for the Department of Energy's Office of Science, the National Science Foundation, and the National Institute of Standards and Technology.

== Works ==
- The Charm of Physics (1991) ISBN 0-88318-708-6
- From Alchemy to Quarks: The Study of Physics as a Liberal Art (1994) ISBN 0-534-16656-3
- Interactions: A Journey Through the Mind of a Particle Physicist and the Matter of this World (1988) ISBN 0-446-51315-6
- First Workshop on Grand Unification: New England Center, University of New Hampshire, April 10–12, 1980 edited with Paul H. Frampton and Asim Yildiz (1980) ISBN 0-915692-31-7
- Third Workshop on Grand Unification, University of North Carolina, Chapel Hill, April 15–17, 1982 edited with Paul H. Frampton and Hendrik van Dam (1982) ISBN 3-7643-3105-4
- "Desperately Seeking Superstrings?" with Paul Ginsparg in Riffing on Strings: Creative Writing Inspired by String Theory (2008) ISBN 978-0-9802114-0-5

== Awards and honors ==
- J. Robert Oppenheimer Memorial Prize (1977)
- Nobel Prize in Physics (1979)
- Golden Plate Award of the American Academy of Achievement (1980)
- Member of the American Philosophical Society (2002)
- High Energy Particle Physics Prize of the European Physical Society (2011, shared with John Iliopoulos and Luciano Maiani)

== See also ==
- Neutral current
- Tadpole
- Weak hypercharge
- List of Jewish Nobel laureates
