= Edison Volta Prize =

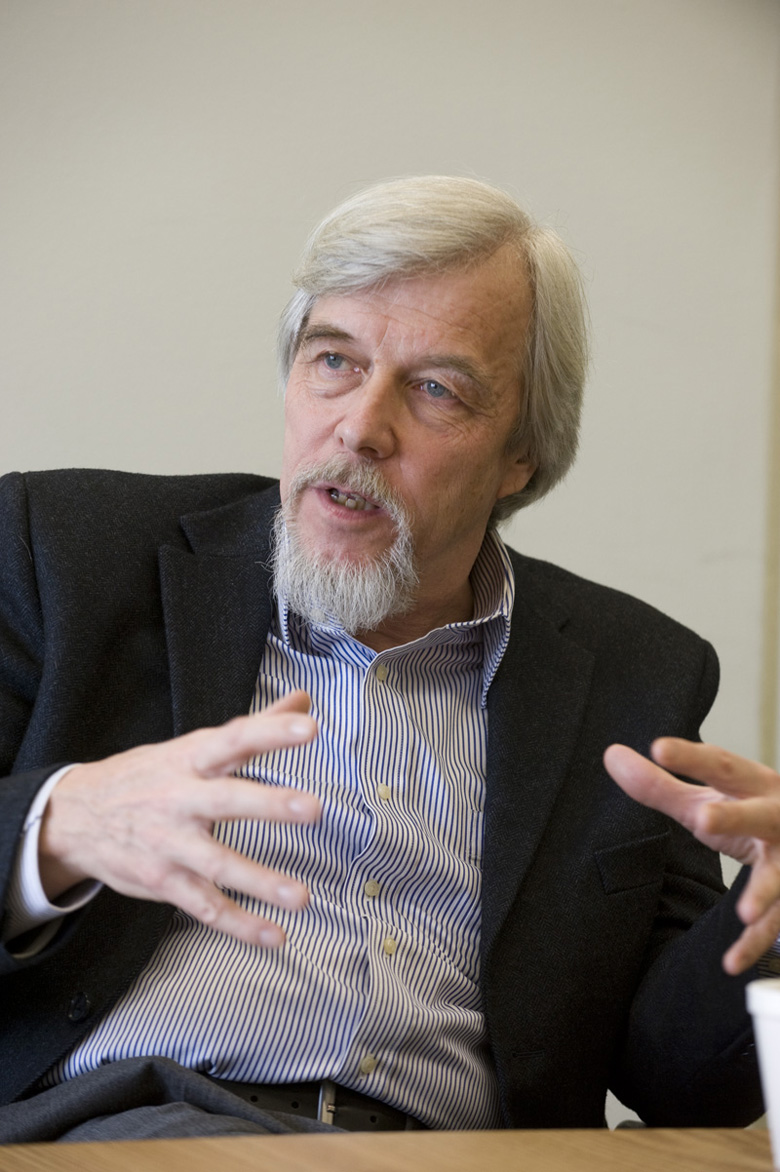
Director General of CERN, Rolf-Dieter Heuer, 2012 Edison Volta Prize laureate

The Edison Volta Prize is awarded biennially by the European Physical Society (EPS) to individuals or groups of up to three people in recognition of outstanding achievements in physics. The award consists of a diploma, a medal, and 10,000 euros in prize money. The award has been established in 2012 by the Centro di Cultura Scientifica "Alessandro Volta", Edison S.p.A. and the European Physical Society.

== 2020 Laureates ==
The 2020 EPS Edison Volta Prize was awarded to:

- Klaus Ensslin, ETH Zurich Laboratorium für Festkörperphysik, Switzerland
- Jurgen Smet, Max Planck Institute for Solid State Research, Stuttgart, Germany
- Dieter Weiss, Universität Regensburg Institut für experimentelle und angewandte Physik, Germany

"for their seminal contributions to condensed matter nano-science".

== 2018 Laureates ==
The 2018 EPS Edison Volta Prize was awarded to:

- Alain Brillet, CNRS, Observatoire de la Côte d’Azur, Nice, France
- Karsten Danzmann, Max-Planck- Institut für Gravitationsphysik and Leibniz University, Hannover, Germany
- Adalberto Giazotto, (died 2017), INFN, Pisa, Italy
- Jim Hough, University of Glasgow, UK

for "the development, in their respective countries, of key technologies and innovative experimental solutions, that enabled the advanced interferometric gravitational wave detectors LIGO and Virgo to detect the first gravitational wave signals from mergers of Black Holes and of Neutron Stars"

== 2016 Laureate ==
2016 - The 2016 EPS Edison Volta Prize was awarded to

- Michel A.G. Orrit, University of Leiden, the Netherlands

for "seminal contributions to optical science, to the field of single-molecule spectroscopy and imaging (first single molecule detection by fluorescence and first optical detection of magnetic resonance in single molecule) and for pioneering investigations into the photoblinking and photobleaching behaviors of individual molecules at the heart of many current optical super-resolution experiments."

== 2015 Laureates ==
The 2015 EPS Edison Volta Prize has been awarded to the three principal scientific leaders of the European Space Agency's (ESA) Planck Mission:

- Nazzareno Mandolesi, University of Ferrara, Italy
- Jean-Loup Puget, Institut d'Astrophysique Spatiale, Université Paris Sud & CNRS, France
- Jan Tauber, Directorate of Science and Robotic Exploration, European Space Agency

"for directing the development of the Planck payload and the analysis of its data, resulting in the refinement of our knowledge of the temperature fluctuations in the Cosmic Microwave Background as a vastly improved tool for doing precision cosmology at unprecedented levels of accuracy, and consolidating our understanding of the very early universe. "

== 2014 Laureate ==
2014 EPS Edison Volta Prize was awarded to:

- Jean-Michel Raimond, Université Pierre et Marie Curie, Professor

"for seminal contribution to physics (that) have paved the way for novel explorations of quantum mechanics and have opened new routes in quantum information processing"

== 2012 Laureates ==
2012 EPS Edison Volta Prize was awarded 12 November 2012 to:

- Rolf-Dieter Heuer, CERN Director General,
- Sergio Bertolucci, CERN Director for Research and Computing,
- Stephen Myers, CERN Director for Accelerators and Technology,

"for having led, building on decades of dedicated work by their predecessors, the culminating efforts in the direction, research and operation of the CERN Large Hadron Collider (LHC), which resulted in many significant advances in high energy particle physics, in particular, the first evidence of a Higgs-like boson in July 2012".

== See also ==
- List of physics awards
