= GIM mechanism =

Mechanism in quantum field theory

In particle physics, the Glashow–Iliopoulos–Maiani (GIM) mechanism is the mechanism through which flavour-changing neutral currents (FCNCs) are suppressed in loop diagrams. It also explains why weak interactions that change strangeness by 2 (ΔS = 2 transitions) are suppressed, while those that change strangeness by 1 (ΔS = 1 transitions) are allowed, but only in charged current interactions. It is named after physicists Sheldon Glashow, John Iliopoulos and Luciano Maiani.

Rare leptonic decay of the neutral Kaon predicated on the GIM mechanism

== History ==
The mechanism was put forth in a famous paper by Glashow, Iliopoulos & Maiani (1970); at that time, only three quarks (up, down, and strange) were thought to exist. James Bjorken and Glashow [Bjorken & Glashow (1964)] had previously predicted a fourth quark, but there was little evidence for its existence. The GIM mechanism however, required the existence of a fourth quark, and the prediction of the charm quark is usually credited to Glashow, Iliopoulos, and Maiani (initials "G. I. M.").

== Description ==
The mechanism relies on the unitarity of the charged weak current flavor mixing matrix, which enters in the two vertices of a one-loop box diagram involving W boson exchanges. Even though Z^{0} boson exchanges are flavor-neutral (i.e. prohibit FCNC), the box diagram induces FCNC, but at a very small level. The smallness is set by the mass-squared difference of the different virtual quarks exchanged in the box diagram, originally the u or c quarks, on the scale of the W mass.

The smallness of this quantity accounts for the suppressed induced FCNC, dictating a rare decay, $\ K_L\to\mu^+\mu^-\ ,$ illustrated in the figure. If that mass difference were ignorable, the minus sign between the two interfering box diagrams (itself a consequence of unitarity of the Cabibbo matrix) would lead to a complete cancellation, and thus a null effect.
