= Torsten Åkesson =

Swedish academic

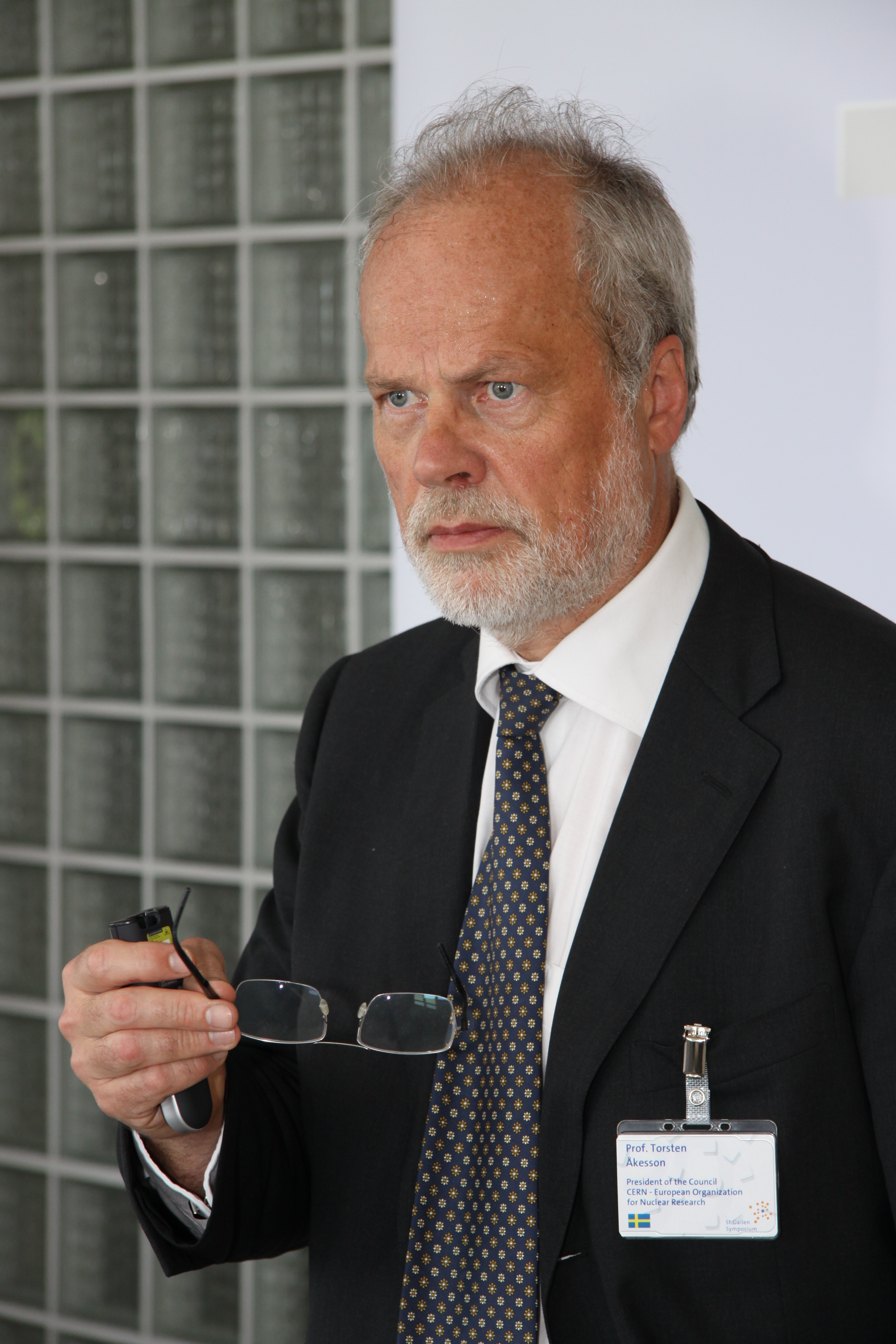
- Åkesson in 2009
- Born: 7 November 1954 (age 71); Skurup, Sweden
- Education: Lund University
- Known for: CERN
- Scientific career
- Fields: Physics
- Workplaces: Lund University

Torsten Åkesson (7 November 1954), is a Swedish physicist and professor in Particle physics at Lund University who is a member of the Royal Swedish Academy of Sciences and was president of the CERN Council.

== Biography ==
Åkesson graduated from Österportskolan in Ystad in 1973, and was awarded his Master of Science in Engineering Physics at Lund University in 1979. He became a Doctor of Philosophy in the field of physics at Lund University in 1986 with Guy von Dardel as his supervisor with a thesis about jets. He continued with his research about jets in CERN. In 1996-2005 he also participated in the management team for the development of the international ATLAS experiment, which among other things was one of the two LHC experiments involved in the discovery of the Higgs boson in July 2012. Between 2005 and 2006 he was Chairman of the European Committee on Future Accelerators (ECFA), where he was responsible for developing a European strategy for particle physics. In 2007-2009 he was President of the CERN Council, where one of his main goals was to start up their particle accelerator and start the experiments at Large Hadron Collider.

Åkesson is elected as a member of the Royal Swedish Academy of Sciences and the Royal Physiographic Society, and he was the head of the Particle Physics Division at Lund University during 2012–2018.

He is since 2019 co-spokesperson for the proposed experiment LDMX.
