= List of honorary fellows of Pembroke College, Oxford =

This is a list of Honorary Fellows of Pembroke College, Oxford. A list of current honorary fellows is published on the college's website at The Fellows.

- John Cameron, Lord Abernethy
- Jonathan Aisbitt
- John Armour
- Sir Philip Bailhache
- Simon Blackburn
- Dame Lynne Brindley
- Ian Burnett, Baron Burnett of Maldon
- Robert Carswell, Baron Carswell
- Elisabeth Kendall
- Alison Light
- Mark Thomson (physicist)
