= Luciano Maiani =

Sammarinese physicist

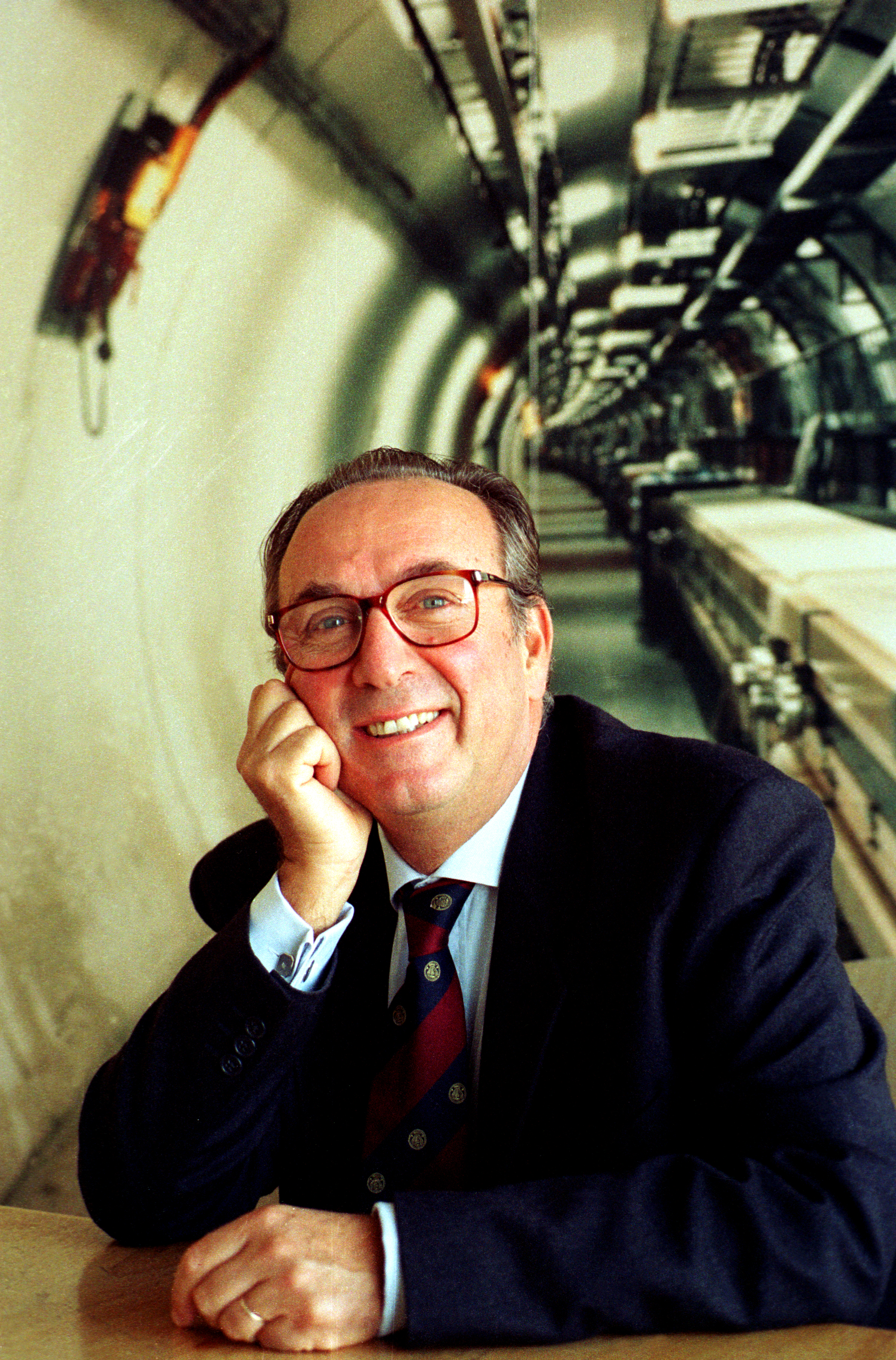
- Maiani in 1996
- Born: June 16, 1941 (age 85); Rome, Italy
- Education: Sapienza University of Rome
- Known for: GIM mechanism Charm quark
- Awards: Matteucci Medal (1979); Sakurai Prize (1987); Dirac Medal (ICTP) (2007); Bruno Pontecorvo Prize (2013)
- Scientific career
- Fields: Particle physics
- Workplaces: Sapienza University of Rome; CERN; INFN

Luciano Maiani (born 16 July 1941) is a Sammarinese physicist. He is best known for his prediction of the charm quark with Sheldon Glashow and John Iliopoulos (the "GIM mechanism").

== Academic history ==
In 1964 Luciano Maiani received his degree in physics and he became a research associate at the Istituto Superiore di Sanità in Italy. During that same year he collaborated with Raoul Gatto's theoretical physics group at the University of Florence. He crossed the Atlantic in 1969 to do a post-doctoral fellowship at Harvard University's Lyman Laboratory of Physics. In 1976 Maiani became a professor of theoretical physics at the University of Rome, however he traveled widely during this period, holding visiting professorships at the École normale supérieure of Paris (1977) and CERN (1979–1980 and 1985–1986). Maiani also took an interest in the direction of particle physics research start on CERN's Scientific Policy Committee from 1984 to 1991. Then, in 1993, until 1998, he became president of Italy's Istituto Nazionale di Fisica Nucleare (INFN). From 1993 to 1996 Maiani served as a scientific delegate in CERN council and then as that council's president in 1997. Thereafter he became director general of CERN, serving from 1 January 1999 through the end of 2003. From 1995 to 1997 Maiani chaired the Italian Comitato Tecnico Scientifico, Fondo Ricerca Applicata. At the end of 2007 he was proposed as president of Consiglio Nazionale delle Ricerche, but his nomination was suspended temporally after he signed a letter criticizing the rector of 'La Sapienza' University in Rome, who invited Pope Benedict XVI to give a lectio magistralis in 2008. However he became the President of CNR since 2008.

As of September 2020, he is a member of the Italian Aspen Institute.

== Research ==
Luciano Maiani has authored over 100 scientific publications on the theory of elementary particles often with several co-authors. In 1970 he predicted the charm quark in a paper with Glashow and Iliopoulos which was later discovered at SLAC and Brookhaven in 1974 and led to a Nobel Prize in Physics for the discoverers. Working with Guido Altarelli in 1974 they explained that the observed octet enhancement in weak non-leptonic decays was due to a leading gluon exchange effect in quantum chromodynamics. They later extended this effect to describe the weak non-leptonic decays of charm and bottom quarks as well and also produced a parton model description of heavy flavor weak decays. In 1976 Maiani analyzed the CP violation in the six-quark theory and predicted the very small electric dipole moment of the neutron. In the 1980s he started using the numerical simulation of lattice QCD and this led to the first prediction of the decay constant of pseudoscalar charmed mesons and of B mesons.

A proponent of supersymmetry, Maiani once said that the search for it was "primary goal of modern particle physics". He has not confined his interest to the theoretical side of physics either, with involvement in ALPI, EUROBALL, DAFNE, VIRGO and the LHC.

== Honors and awards ==
- 1979 Matteucci Medal, Accademia Nazionale dei XL
- 1987 Sakurai Prize of the American Physical Society
- 1996 Doctor honoris causa, Université de la Méditerranée, Aix-Marseille
- 2007 Dirac Medal, Abdus Salam International Centre for Theoretical Physics, Trieste, Italy
- 2010 Doctor honoris causa, Benemérita Universidad Autónoma de Puebla, Puebla, México
- 2011 High Energy Particle Physics Prize by the European Physical Society.
- 2013 Bruno Pontecorvo Prize by the Joint Institute for Nuclear Research, Dubna, Russia

== See also ==
- GIM mechanism

Preceded by Christopher Llewellyn Smith	CERN Director General; 1999 – 2003	Succeeded by Robert Aymar
