= Robert Aymar =

French physicist (1936–2024)

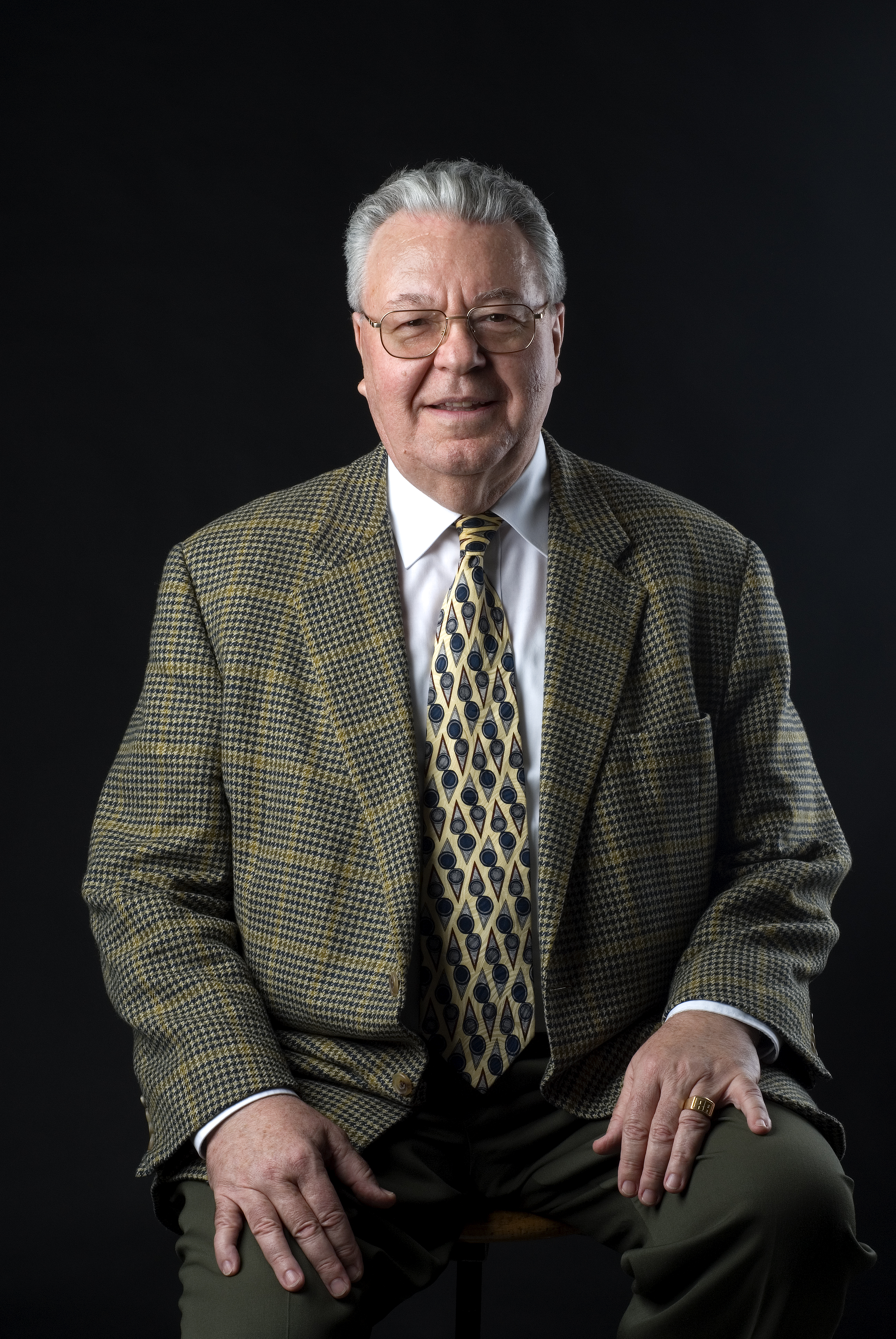
Aymar in 2006

Robert Aymar (1936 – 23 September 2024) was a French physicist who was the Director General of CERN (2004–2008), serving a five-year term in that role.

== Life and career ==
Aymar was born in 1936 in France. After studying at the École Polytechnique, he entered the Corps des Poudres (a former government agency involved in basic and applied research). Following his secondment to the Commissariat à l'énergie atomique (CEA) in 1959, his career was focused on fundamental research in plasma physics and its application in controlled thermonuclear fusion research.

In 1977, Aymar was appointed Head of the Tore Supra project, to be constructed at Cadarache, France. In 1990, he was appointed Director of the Direction des Sciences de la Matière of the CEA, where he directed a wide range of basic research programmes, both experimental and theoretical.

Aymar served on many Councils and Committees at national and international level, for example, the Institut Laue Langevin (ILL), the European Synchrotron Research Facility (ESRF), and the Joint European Torus (JET). He also acted as chairman of the European Fusion Technology Steering Committee, and as a member of the ITER (International Thermonuclear Experimental Reactor) Technical Advisory Committee. He was appointed ITER Director in 1994 and International Team Leader in 2001.

He chaired the international scientific committee that assessed CERN's Large Hadron Collider (LHC) and recommended it for approval in 1996. He also chaired the External Review Committee that was set up by the CERN Council in December 2001 to review the CERN programme.

Aymar succeeded Luciano Maiani as Director-General of CERN in January 2004. He was honoured in 2006 with the International Global Energy Prize, in 2011 with the National Order of the Legion of Honour of the French Republic. In 2011 he gave a talk The Origin of LEP and LHC at the international symposium on subnuclear physics held in Vatican City.

Aymar died on 23 September 2024, at the age of 88.

Business positions
Preceded by Luciano Maiani	Director General of CERN; 1 January 2004 – 31 December 2008	Succeeded by Rolf-Dieter Heuer
