= John Iliopoulos =

Greek physicist

- Ιωάννης Ηλιόπουλος
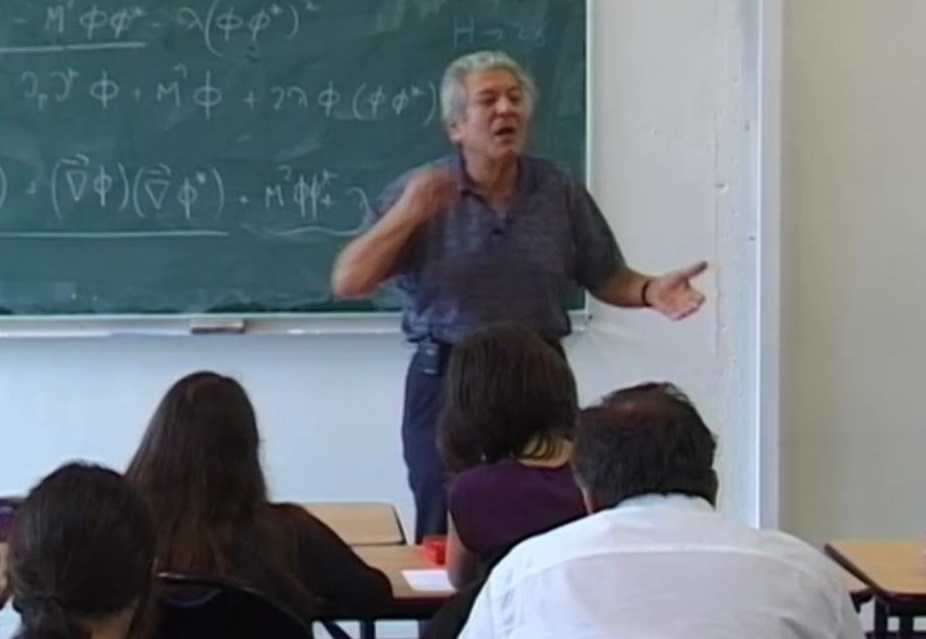
- John Iliopoulos at the École Normale Supérieure, Paris, 2009.
- Born: 1940 (age 85–86); Kalamata, Greece
- Education: National Technical University of Athens; University of Paris (PhD)
- Known for: Charm quark GIM mechanism Fayet–Iliopoulos D-term
- Awards: Sakurai Prize (1987); Dirac Medal (ICTP) (2007); High Energy and Particle Physics Prize (2011)
- Scientific career
- Fields: Particle physics
- Workplaces: École normale supérieure (Paris)
- Thesis: Théorème de basse énergie et algèbre des courants (1968)

John (Jean) Iliopoulos (Greek: Ιωάννης Ηλιόπουλος; 1940) is a Greek physicist. He is the first person to present the Standard Model of particle physics in a single report. He is best known for his prediction of the charm quark with Sheldon Glashow and Luciano Maiani (the "GIM mechanism"). Iliopoulos is also known for demonstrating the cancellation of anomalies in the Standard model. He is further known for the Fayet–Iliopoulos D-term formula, which was introduced in 1974. He is currently an honorary member of Laboratory of theoretical physics of École normale supérieure, Paris.

== Biography ==
Iliopoulos graduated from National Technical University of Athens (NTUA) in 1962 as a Mechanical-Electrical Engineer. He continued his studies in the field of Theoretical Physics in University of Paris, and in 1963 he obtained the D.E.A, in 1965 the Doctorat 3e Cycle, and in 1968 the Doctorat d' Etat titles. Between the years 1966 and 1968 he was a scholar at CERN, Geneva. From 1969 till 1971 he was a Research Associate in Harvard University. In 1971 he returned in Paris and began working at CNRS. He also held the director position of the Laboratory of Theoretical Physics of the École normale supérieure between the years 1991-1995 and 1998-2002. In 2002, Iliopoulos was the first recipient of the Aristeio prize, which has been instituted to recognize Greeks who have made significant contributions towards furthering their chosen fields of science. Iliopoulos and Maiani were jointly awarded the 1987 Sakurai Prize for theoretical particle physics. In 2007 Iliopoulos and Maiani received the Dirac Medal of the ICTP "(f)or their work on the physics of the charm quark, a major contribution to the birth of the Standard Model, the modern theory of Elementary Particles." And in 2011, Glashow, Iliopoulos, and Maiani received the High Energy and Particle Physics Prize, awarded by the European Physical Society (EPS), "(f)or their crucial contribution to the theory of flavour, presently embedded in the Standard Theory of strong and electroweak interactions."

== Scientific work ==
Iliopoulos is a specialist in high energy theoretical physics and elementary particle physics. In 1970, in collaboration with Sheldon Glashow and Luciano Maïani, he introduced the so-called "GIM mechanism" (named after the three authors) which is an essential element of the theory of fundamental interactions known as the "Standard Model ". This mechanism postulates the existence of a new elementary particle, the "charmed" quark, a prediction that was confirmed by experiments. In 1972, in collaboration with Claude Bouchiat and Philippe Meyer, he demonstrated that the mathematical coherence of the Standard Model requires symmetry between the elementary constituents of matter, namely quarks (which form hadrons such as proton and neutron) and leptons (such as electron, muon and neutrinos). This symmetry is also verified experimentally.

Iliopoulos was one of the pioneers of supersymmetry, the hypothetical symmetry that links fermions and bosons. He showed that it has remarkable convergence properties and, in collaboration with Pierre Fayet, he proposed a mechanism that leads to its spontaneous breakage. He also studied some aspects of the quantum theory of gravitation as well as the mathematical properties of invariant gauge theories formulated in a non-commutative geometric space.

== Most significant publications ==
- Glashow, S. L.; Iliopoulos, J.; Maiani, L. (1970-10-01). "Weak Interactions with Lepton-Hadron Symmetry". Physical Review D. 2 (7). American Physical Society (APS): 1285–1292. Bibcode:1970PhRvD...2.1285G. doi:10.1103/physrevd.2.1285. ISSN 0556-2821.
- Bouchiat, C.; Iliopoulos, J.; Meyer, Ph. (1972). "An anomaly-free version of Weinberg's model". Physics Letters B. 38 (7). Elsevier BV: 519–523. Bibcode:1972PhLB...38..519B. doi:10.1016/0370-2693(72)90532-1. ISSN 0370-2693.
- Iliopoulos, J.; Zumino, B. (1974). "Broken supergauge symmetry and renormalization". Nuclear Physics B. 76 (2). Elsevier BV: 310–332. Bibcode:1974NuPhB..76..310I. doi:10.1016/0550-3213(74)90388-5. ISSN 0550-3213.
- Fayet, P.; Iliopoulos, J. (1974). "Spontaneously broken supergauge symmetries and goldstone spinors". Physics Letters B. 51 (5). Elsevier BV: 461–464. Bibcode:1974PhLB...51..461F. doi:10.1016/0370-2693(74)90310-4. ISSN 0370-2693.
- Antoniadis, I.; Iliopoulos, J.; Tomaras, T. N. (1986-03-31). "Quantum Instability of de Sitter Space" (PDF). Physical Review Letters. 56 (13). American Physical Society (APS): 1319–1322. Bibcode:1986PhRvL..56.1319A. doi:10.1103/physrevlett.56.1319. ISSN 0031-9007. OSTI 1447832. PMID 10032637.
- Floratos, E.G.; Iliopoulos, J.; Tomaras, T.N. (1987). "Tree-level scattering amplitudes in de Sitter space diverge". Physics Letters B. 197 (3). Elsevier BV: 373–378. Bibcode:1987PhLB..197..373F. doi:10.1016/0370-2693(87)90403-5. ISSN 0370-2693.
- Floratos, E.G.; Iliopoulos, J.; Tiktopoulos, G. (1989). "A note on SU(∞) classical Yang-Mills theories". Physics Letters B. 217 (3). Elsevier BV: 285–288. Bibcode:1989PhLB..217..285F. doi:10.1016/0370-2693(89)90867-8. ISSN 0370-2693.
- Floratos, E.G.; Iliopoulos, J. (2006). "Gauge theories and non-commutative geometry". Physics Letters B. 632 (4): 566–570. arXiv:hep-th/0509055. Bibcode:2006PhLB..632..566F. doi:10.1016/j.physletb.2005.10.081. ISSN 0370-2693.
- J. Iliopoulos, Aux origines de la masse, EDP Sciences (2015)
- J. Iliopoulos, The Origin of Mass, Oxford University Press (2017)
- L. Baulieu, J. Iliopoulos, R. Sénéor, From Classical to Quantum Fields, Oxford University Press (2017)
- Theodore N. Tomaras, John Iliopoulos, Elementary Particle Physics - The Standard Theory, Oxford University Press (2021)

== Awards ==
- 1978 Paul Langevin Prize of the French Physical Society
- 1980 Corresponding Member, Academy of Athens, Greece
- 1984 Jean Ricard Prize of the French Physical Society
- 1987 Sakurai Prize of the American Physical Society
- 1990 / 2002 Corresponding / Full Member of the French Academy of Sciences
- 1996 Doctor honoris causa, Université de la Méditerranée, Aix-Marseille, France
- 1999 Doctor honoris causa, University of Crete, Greece
- 2002 Doctor honoris causa, University of Ioannina, Greece
- 2002 Doctor honoris causa, University of Athens, Greece
- 2002 Bodossaki Prize
- 2005 Matteucci Medal, Accademia Nazionale delle Scienze, detta dei XL
- 2007 Dirac Medal, Abdus Salam International Centre for Theoretical Physics, Trieste, Italy
- 2011 High Energy Particle Physics Prize, European Physical Society
- 2013 Three Physicists Prize, Ecole Normale Supérieure, France
- 2017 Doctor honoris causa, National Technical University of Athens, Greece
- 2023 Antonio Feltrinelli Prize, Accademia dei Lincei, Italy

== See also ==
- GIM mechanism
