= Nicholas P. Samios =

American physicist

Nicholas Peter Samios (born March 15, 1932, in NYC) is an American physicist and former director of the Brookhaven National Laboratory in Upton, New York.

== Biography ==
He majored in physics at Columbia College of Columbia University, from which he graduated in 1953; he earned his PhD at Columbia in 1957. He worked on the Columbia faculty for three years before joining Brookhaven's physics department, where he was appointed laboratory director in May 1982. A major achievement of his tenure was the construction of the RHIC, the first heavy-ion collider. He stepped down as director in 1997 after a dispute on leaked radioactivity in the laboratory, but continued to work as a researcher. In 2003 he became director of the RIKEN BNL Research Center.

== Scientific achievements ==
Samios has specialized in the physics of high-energy particles. He is especially known for his study of elementary particles, in particular for the discovery of the Omega minus particle in 1964 as postulated by Murray Gell-Mann and Yuval Ne'eman, as well as the first charmed baryon. These discoveries have contributed to the understanding of the spectrum of particles and have carried to the formulation of Quantum Chromodynamics and the Standard Model of particle physics.

== Awards ==
- 1980 Ernest Orlando Lawrence Award
- 1982 Member of the National Academy of Sciences
- 1993 Panofsky Prize
- 2009 Gian Carlo Wick Gold Medal
