= Charmed baryon =

Type of particle

Charmed baryons are a category of composite particles comprising all baryons made of at least one charm quark. Since their first observation in the 1970s, a large number of distinct charmed baryon states have been identified. Observed charmed baryons have masses ranging between 2300 and 2700 MeV/c^{2}. In 2002, the SELEX collaboration, based at Fermilab published evidence of a doubly charmed baryon (Ξ^{+}_{cc}), containing two charm quarks, with a mass of ~3520 MeV/c^{2}, but has yet to be confirmed by other experiments. However, the LHCb collaboration claims to have found evidence for the doubly charmed baryon (Ξ^{++}_{cc}) in 2017. One triply charmed baryon (Ω^{++}_{ccc}) has been predicted but not yet observed.

== Nomenclature ==
The nomenclature of charmed baryons is based on both quark content and isospin. The naming follows the rules established by the Particle Data Group.

- Charmed baryons composed of one charm quark and two up, one up and one down, or two down quarks are known as charmed Lambdas (Λ_{c}, isospin 0), or charmed Sigmas (Σ_{c}, isospin 1).
- Charmed baryons of isospin composed of one charm quark, and one up or down quark are known as charmed Xis (Ξ_{c}) and all have isospin 1/2.
- Charmed baryons composed of one charm quark and no up or down quarks are called charmed Omegas (Ω_{c}) and all have isospin 0.
- Charmed baryons composed of two charm quarks and one up or down quark are called double charmed Xis (Ξ_{cc}) and all have isospin 1/2).
- Charmed baryons composed of two charm quarks and no up or down quarks are called double charmed Omega (Ω_{cc}) and all have isospin 0.
- Charmed baryons composed of three charm quarks are called triple charmed Omegas (Ω_{ccc}), and all have isospin 0.

Charge is indicated with superscripts. Heavy quark (bottom, charm, or top quarks) content is indicated by subscripts. For example, a Ξ^{+}_{cb} is made of one bottom, one charmed quark, and it can be deduced from the charge of the charm (+2/3e) and bottom quark (−1/3e) that the other quark must be an up quark (+2/3e). Sometimes asterisks or primes are used to indicate a resonance.

== Properties ==
The important parameters of charmed baryons, to be studied, consist of four properties. They are firstly the mass, secondly the lifetime for those with a measurable lifetime, thirdly the intrinsic width (those particles that have too short a lifetime to measure have a measurable "width" or spread in mass due to Heisenberg's uncertainty principle), and lastly their decay modes. Compilations of measurements of these may be found in the publications of the Particle Data Group.

== Production and detection ==
Charmed baryons are formed in high-energy particle collisions, such as those produced by particle accelerators. The general method to find them is to detect their decay products, identify what particles they are, and measure their momenta. If all the decay products are found and measured correctly, then the mass of the parent particle may be calculated. As an example, a favored decay of the Λ^{+}_{c} is into a proton, a kaon and a pion. The momenta of these (rather stable) particles are measured by the detector and using the usual rules of four-momentum using the correct relativistic equations, this gives a measure of the mass of the parent particle.

In particle collisions, the protons, kaons and pions are all rather commonly produced, and only a fraction of these combinations will have come from a charmed baryon. Thus, it is important to measure many such combinations. A plot of the calculated parent mass will then have a peak at the mass of the Λ^{+}_{c}, but this is in addition to a smooth "phase space" background. The width of the peak will be governed by the resolution of the detector, provided that the charmed baryon is reasonably stable (such as the Λ^{+}_{c} which has a lifetime of around (2±10)×10^{−13} s). Other, higher states of charmed baryons, which decay by the strong interaction, typically have large intrinsic widths. This makes the peak stand up less definitively against the background combinations. First observations of particles by this method are notoriously difficult – overzealous interpretation of statistical fluctuations or effects that produce false "peaks" mean that several published results were later found to be false. However, with more data collected by more experiments over the years, the spectroscopy of the charmed baryons states has now reached a mature level.

== Charmed lambda+ history ==
The first charmed baryon to be discovered was the Λ^{+}_{c}. It is not entirely clear when the particle was first observed; there were a number of experiments which published evidence for the state beginning in 1975, but the reported masses were frequently lower than the value now known. Since then, Λ^{+}_{c} have been produced and studied at many experiments, notably fixed-target experiments (such as FOCUS and SELEX) and e^{−}e^{+} B-factories (ARGUS, CLEO, BABAR, and BELLE).

=== Mass ===
The definitive mass measurement has been made by the BaBar experiment, which reported a mass of 2286.46 MeV/c^{2} with a small uncertainty. To put this in context, it is more than twice as heavy as a proton. The excess mass is easily explained by the large constituent mass of the charm quark, which by itself is more than that of the proton.

=== Lifetime ===
The lifetime of the Λ^{+}_{c} is measured to be almost exactly 0.2 picoseconds. This is a typical lifetime for particles that decay via the weak interaction, taking into account the large available phase space. The lifetime measurement has contributions from a number of experiments, notably FOCUS, SELEX and CLEO.

=== Decays ===
The Λ^{+}_{c} decays into a multitude of different final states, according to the rules of weak decays. The decay into a proton, kaon and pion (each of them charged) is a favorite with experimenters as it is particularly easy to detect. It accounts for around 5% of all decays; around 30 distinct decay modes have been measured. Studies of these branching ratios enable theoreticians to disentangle the various fundamental diagrams contributing the decays and is a window on weak interaction physics.

=== Orbital excitations ===
The quark model, together with quantum mechanics predicts that there should be orbital excitations of Λ^{+}_{c} particles. The lowest lying of these states are ones where the two light quarks (the up and down) combine into a spin-0 state, one unit of orbital angular momentum is added, and this combines with the intrinsic spin of the charm quark to make a 1/2, 3/2 pair of particles. The higher of these (the Λ^{+}_{c}(2625)) was discovered in 1993 by ARGUS. At first it was not clear what state had been discovered, but the subsequent discovery of the lower state (2593) by CLEO clarified the situation. The decay modes, the masses, the measured widths, and the decays via two charged pions rather than one charged and one neutral pion, all confirm the identification of the states.

== Charmed Sigma quark content ==
As noted above, charmed Sigma particles, like Λ^{+}_{c} particles, comprise a charm quark and two light up, down, strange) quarks. However, Σ_{c} particles have isospin 1. This is equivalent to saying that they can exist in three charged states, the doubly charged, the singly charged, and the neutral. The situation is directly analogous to the strange baryon nomenclature. The ground state (that is, with no orbital angular momentum) baryons can also be pictured thus. Each quark is a spin 1/2 particle. The spins can be pointed up, or down. In Λ^{+}_{c} ground state, the two light quarks point up-down to give a zero spin diquark. This then combines with the charm quark to give a spin 1/2 particle. In the Σ_{c}, the two light quarks combine to give a spin 1 diquark, which then combines with the charm quark to give either a spin 1/2 particle, or a spin 3/2 particle (normally known as a Σ^{∗}_{c}). It is the rules of quantum mechanics that make it possible for a Λ_{c} to exist only with three different quarks (that is cud quarks), whereas the Σ_{c} can exist as cuu, cud or cdd (thus the three different charges).

All Σ_{c} particles decay by the strong force. Typically this mean the emission of a pion as it decays down to the comparatively stable Λ^{+}_{c}. Thus their masses are not usually measured directly, but in terms of their mass differences, m(Σ_{c})−m(Λ^{+}_{c}). This is experimentally easier to measure precisely, and theoretically easier to predict, than the absolute value of the mass.

=== Σ_{c}(2455) history and mass ===
The lowest-mass Σ_{c} was given the name "2455" by the Particle Data Group, using their convention that strongly decaying particles are known by a rough value of their mass. It was searched for since the early days of charmed baryon studies. Individual events in bubble chambers were several times touted by experiments as evidence of the particles, but it is unclear how one event of this sort can be used as evidence of a resonance. As early as 1979, there was reasonable evidence of the doubly charged state from the Columbia–Brookhaven collaboration. In 1987–89, a series of experiments (E-400 at Fermilab, ARGUS and CLEO) with much larger statistics, found clear evidence for both the doubly charged and neutral states (though the E-400 neutral state turned out to be a false signal). It became clear that the mass difference m(Σ_{c}) − m(Λ^{+}_{c}) is around 168 MeV/c^{2}. The singly-charged state was harder to detect, not because it is harder to produce, but simply because its decay via a neutral pion has more background and inferior resolution when detected by most particle detectors. It was not found (except for the report of a single event), until 1993 by CLEO.

The intrinsic width of the Σ_{c} is small by the standard of most strong decays, but has now been measured, at least for the neutral and doubly charged states, to be around 2 MeV/c^{2} by the CLEO and FOCUS detectors.

The next state up in mass is the spin 3/2 state, usually known as the Σ^{∗}_{c} or the Σ_{c}(2520). These are clearly going to be "wider" because of the extra phase space of their decay, which like the Σ_{c}(2455) is to one pion plus a ground-state Λ_{c}. Again, large statistics are necessary to claim a signal above the large number of Λ_{c}-π pairs that are produced. Again, the neutral and doubly charged states are experimentally easier to detect, and these were discovered in 1997 by the CLEO Collaboration. The singly charged state had to wait till 2001 by the time they had collected more data.

== Ξ_{c} history and mass ==
In the standard quark model, Ξ^{+}_{c} comprises a csu quark combination and the Ξ^{0}_{c} comprises a csd quark combination. Both particles decay via the weak interaction. The first observation of the Ξ^{+}_{c} was in 1983 by the WA62 collaboration working at CERN. They found a significant peak in the decay mode ΛK^{−}π^{+}π^{+} at a mass of 2460±25 MeV/c^{2}. The present value for the mass is taken from an average of 6 experiments, and is 2467.9±0.4 MeV/c^{2}.

The Ξ^{0}_{c} was discovered in 1989 by the CLEO, who measured a peak in the decay mode of Ξ^{−}π^{+} with a mass of 2471±5 MeV/c^{2}. The accepted value is 2471.0±0.4 MeV/c^{2}.

== Charmed Omega history and mass ==
Not surprisingly, of the four weakly decaying, singly charmed baryons, the Ω_{c} (the css quark combination), was the last to be discovered and the least-well measured. Its history is murky. Some authors claim that in 1985 a cluster of three events observed at CERN was a signal, but this can now be excluded on the grounds of its incorrect mass. The ARGUS experiment published a small peak as a possible signal in 1993, but this can now be excluded on cross-section grounds, as many experiments have operated in the same environment as ARGUS with many more collisions. The E-687 experiment at Fermilab published two papers, one in 1993 and the other in 1994. The former one showed a small peak of marginal significance in the decay mode Ωπ, and a larger, apparently robust signal in the decay mode Σ^{+}K^{−}K^{−}π^{+}. This latter observation is considered valid by the Particle Data Group, but increasingly seems odd in that this decay mode has not been observed by other experiments. The CLEO experiment then showed a peak of 40 events in the sum of a variety of decay modes and a mass of 2494.6 MeV/c^{2}. Since then, two experiments, BaBar, and Belle, have taken a great deal of data, and have shown very strong signals at a mass very similar to the CLEO value. However, neither have done the necessary studies to be able to quote a mass with an uncertainty. Therefore, though there is no doubt that the particle has been discovered, there is no definitive measurement of its mass.
