= Rolf-Dieter Heuer =

German particle physicist

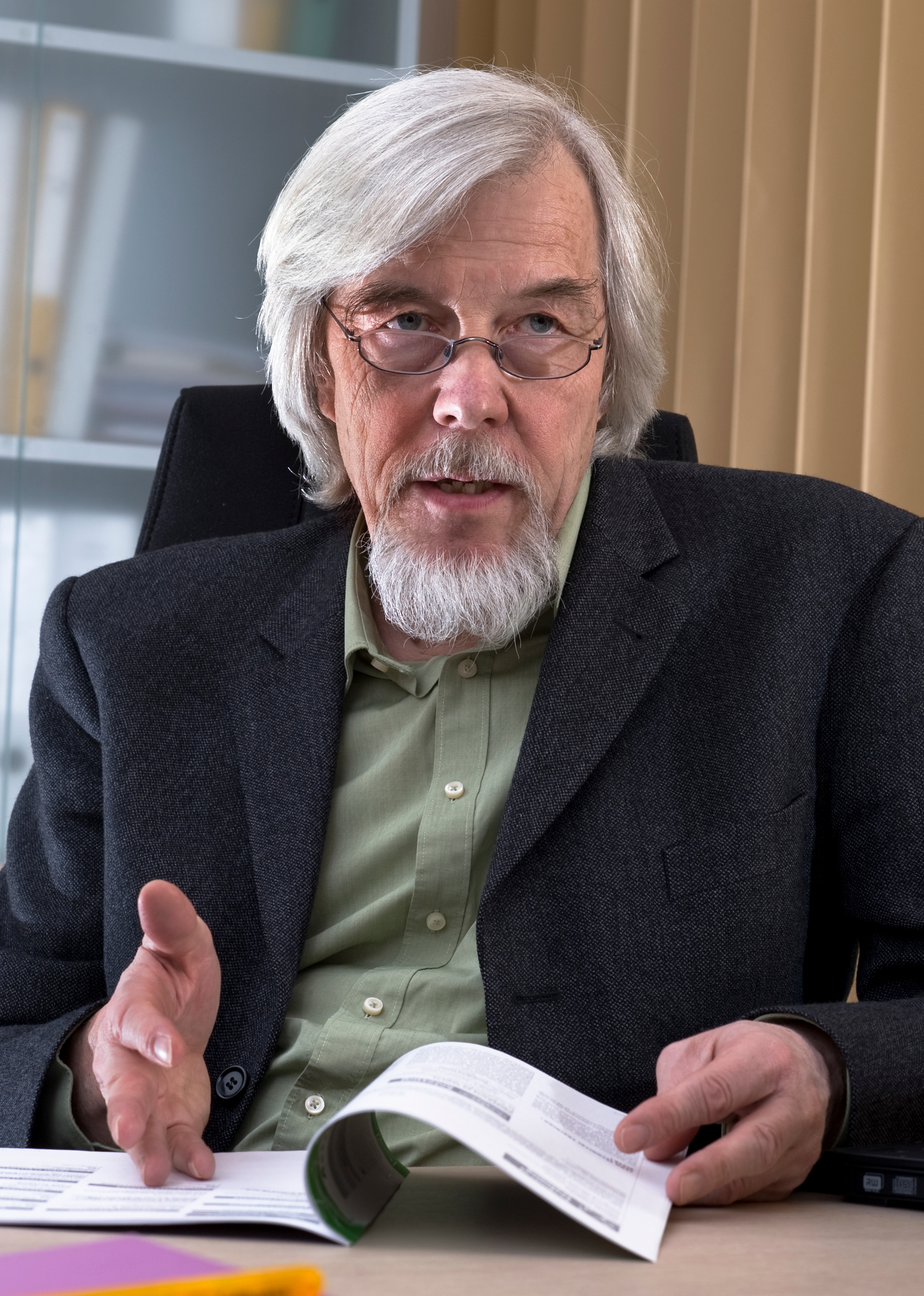
- Heuer in 2009
- Born: 24 May 1948 (age 78); Bad Boll, Baden-Württemberg
- Awards: Nature's 10 (2012)
- Scientific career
- Institutions: Deutsche Physikalische Gesellschaft; CERN; University of Stuttgart; University of Heidelberg
- Doctoral advisor: Joachim Heintze

Rolf-Dieter Heuer (German: [ʁɔlf ˈdiːtɐ ˈhɔʏɐ]; born 24 May 1948) is a German particle physicist. From 2009 to 2015 he was Director General of CERN and from 5 April 2016 to 9 April 2018 President of the German Physical Society (Deutsche Physikalische Gesellschaft). Since 2015 he has been Chair of the European Commission's Group of Chief Scientific Advisors, and since May 2017 he has been President of the SESAME Council.

== Biography ==
Heuer studied physics at the University of Stuttgart. He then obtained his PhD 1977 at the University of Heidelberg under Joachim Heintze for his study of neutral decay modes of the Ψ(3686).

His post-doc studies include the JADE experiment at the electron-positron storage ring PETRA at DESY, and from 1984, at the OPAL experiment at CERN, where he also became spokesperson of the OPAL collaboration for many years.

Having been offered a full professorship for experimental physics at the University of Hamburg, Heuer returned to DESY in 1998. In 2004, he was appointed DESY's Research Director.

In December 2007, the CERN research council announced that Heuer would become CERN's Director General starting 1 January 2009, succeeding Robert Aymar.

In 2011 Heuer gave a talk The High Energy Frontier Past, Present and Future at the international symposium on subnuclear physics held in Vatican City.

Since November 2015, Heuer has been a member of the Group of Chief Scientific Advisors set up by the European Commission. In 2016 he became President of the Deutsche Physikalische Gesellschaft, and in May 2017 the President of the SESAME Council.

In 2022, Heuer was appointed a member of the African Synchrotron Initiative Think Tank with a view to set up a Pan-African project for the African Light Source.

== Awards ==
- On 15 June 2011, Heuer was awarded an honorary degree by the University of Victoria.
- On 19 July 2011, Heuer was awarded an honorary doctorate by the University of Liverpool. In his speech to the graduands he spoke of the need to bring science into mainstream culture.
- On 16 December 2011, Heuer was awarded an honorary degree by the University of Birmingham.
- On 13 June 2012, Heuer was awarded an honorary degree by the University of Glasgow.
- On 12 November 2012, he was awarded an Edison Volta Prize.
- On 5 December 2013, he was awarded the UNESCO Niels Bohr Medal.
- In May 2015, he was awarded a Grand Cross 1st class of the German Order of Merit.
- In September 2015, Heuer was awarded an honorary doctorate by the University of Belgrade.
- On 22 November 2016, Heuer was appointed a Knight of the Legion of Honour.

Business positions
Preceded by Robert Aymar	Director General of CERN; 2009–2015	Succeeded by Fabiola Gianotti
