= List of presidents of the CERN Council =

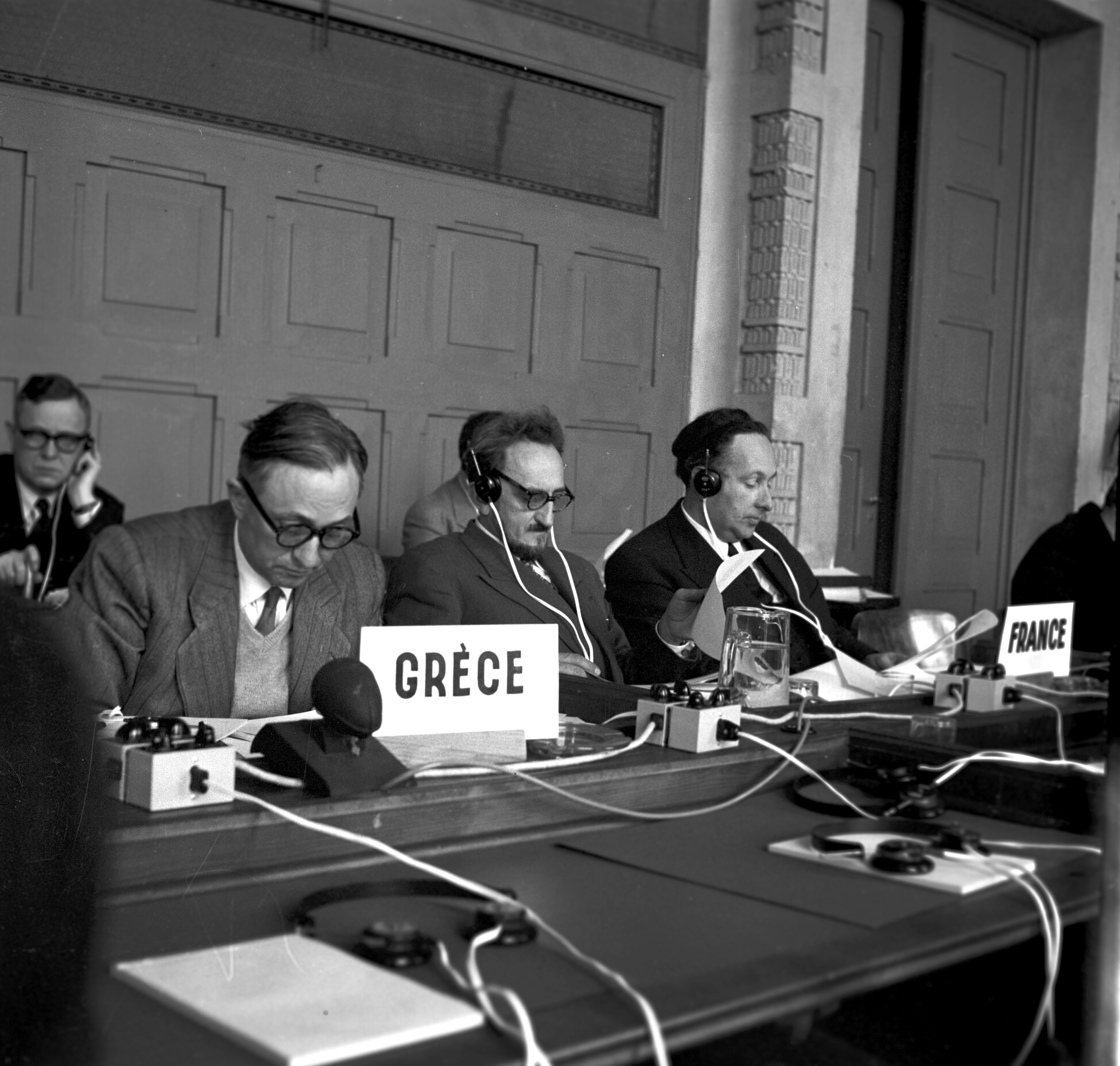
CERN Council's second meeting

This is a list of the presidents of the CERN Council, the decision-making authority of the European Organization for Nuclear Research.

== List ==
Presidents of the CERN Council
Term	President	Country
1954–1957	Sir Ben Lockspeiser	United Kingdom
1958–1960	François de Tricornot de Rose	France
1961–1963	Jean Willems	Belgium
1964–1966	Jan Hendrik Bannier	Netherlands
1967–1969	Gösta Funke	Sweden
1970–1971	Edoardo Amaldi	Italy
1972–1974	Wolfgang Gentner	Germany
1975–1977	Paul Levaux	Belgium
1978–1981, July	Jean Teillac	France
1982–1984	Sir Alec Merrison	United Kingdom
1985–1987	Wolfgang Kummer	Austria
1988–1990	Josef Rembser	Germany
1991–1993	Sir William Mitchell	United Kingdom
1994–1996	Hubert Curien	France
1997	Luciano Maiani	San Marino
1998–2000	Hans C. Eschelbacher	Germany
2001–2003	Maurice Bourquin	Switzerland
2004–2006	Enzo Iarocci	Italy
2007–2009	Torsten Åkesson	Sweden
2010–2012	Michel Spiro	France
2013–2015	Agnieszka Zalewska	Poland
2016–2018	Sijbrand de Jong	Netherlands
2019–2021	Ursula Bassler	France
2022–2024	Eliezer Rabinovici	Israel
2025–	Costas Fountas	Greece
