= Diquark =

Proposed baryon model

In particle physics, a diquark, or diquark correlation/clustering, is a hypothetical state of two quarks grouped inside a baryon (that consists of three quarks). Corresponding models of baryons are referred to as quark–diquark models. The diquark is often treated as a single subatomic particle with which the third quark interacts via the strong interaction. The existence of diquarks inside the nucleons is a disputed issue, but it helps to explain some nucleon properties and to reproduce experimental data sensitive to the nucleon structure. Diquark–antidiquark pairs have also been advanced for anomalous particles such as the X(3872).

== Formation ==
The forces between the two quarks in a diquark is attractive when both the colors and spins are antisymmetric. When both quarks are correlated in this way, they tend to form a very low energy configuration. This low energy configuration has become known as a diquark.

== Controversy ==
Many scientists theorize that a diquark should not be considered a particle. Even though they may contain two quarks they are not color neutral, and therefore cannot exist as isolated bound states. So instead they tend to float freely inside hadrons as composite entities; while free-floating they have a size of about 1 fm. This also happens to be the same size as the hadron itself.

== Uses ==
Diquarks are the conceptual building blocks, and as such give scientists an ordering principle for the most important states in the hadronic spectrum. There are many different pieces of evidence that prove diquarks are fundamental in the structure of hadrons. One of the most compelling pieces of evidence comes from a recent study of baryons. In this study the baryon had one heavy and two light quarks. Since the heavy quark is inert, the scientists were able to discern the properties of the different quark configurations in the hadronic spectrum.

== Λ and Σ baryon experiment ==
An experiment was conducted using diquarks in an attempt to study the Λ and Σ baryons that are produced in the creation of hadrons created by fast-moving quarks. In the experiment the quarks ionized the vacuum area. This produced the quark–antiquark pairs, which then converted themselves into mesons. When generating a baryon by assembling quarks, it is helpful if the quarks first form a stable two-quark state. The Λ and the Σ are created as a result of up, down and strange quarks. Scientists found that the Λ contains the [ud] diquark, however the Σ does not. From this experiment scientists inferred that Λ baryons are more common than Σ baryons, and indeed they are more common by a factor of 10.
