= Mark Thomson (physicist) =

British particle physicist (born 1966)

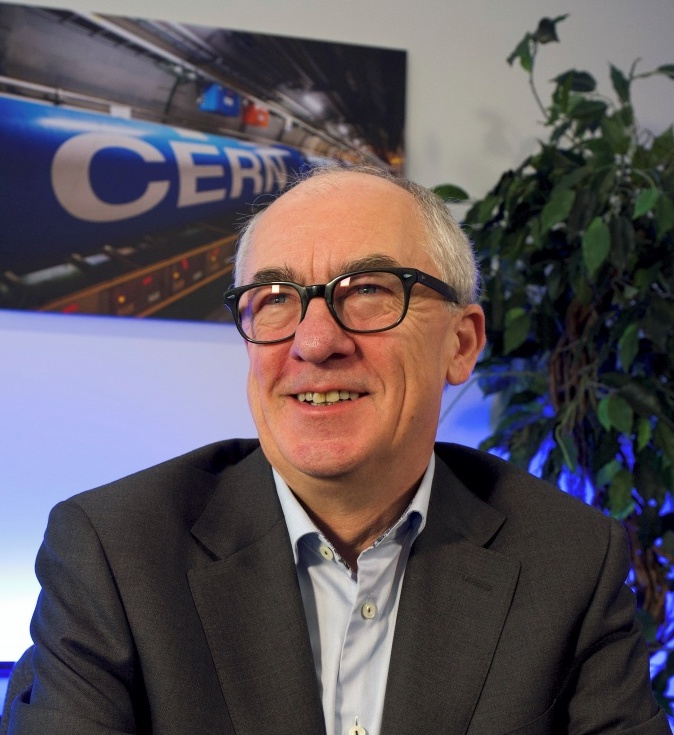
- Born: Mark Andrew Thomson; April 28, 1966 (age 60); United Kingdom
- Education: Worthing Sixth Form College
- Alma mater: Pembroke College Oxford, University of Oxford
- Scientific career
- Fields: Particle physics
- Workplaces: CERN; Science and Technology Facilities Council; University of Cambridge; Fermilab
- Thesis: An experimental study of the possible association of deep underground muons with astronomical point sources (1991)
- Doctoral advisor: John Henry Cobb
- Website: www.hep.phy.cam.ac.uk/~thomson/

Mark Andrew Thomson (born 28 April 1966) is a British particle physicist. He is a Professor of Experimental Particle Physics at the Cavendish Laboratory at the University of Cambridge and a Fellow at Emmanuel College, Cambridge. From January 2018 to December 2024, he was the Executive Chair of the Science and Technology Facilities Council, one of the nine councils of UK Research and Innovation. Thomson was a delegate of the United Kingdom to the CERN Council, the Square Kilometre Array Observatory (SKAO) and European Spallation Source ERIC (ESS). Thomson was appointed director-general of CERN on 1 January 2026.

== Education ==
Thomson was educated at Worthing Sixth Form College where he completed A-levels in Mathematics, Further Mathematics, Physics and Chemistry. Thomson completed a Bachelor of Arts degree in Physics in 1988 and a Doctor of Philosophy degree in 1991 on Experimental Physics at the University of Oxford supervised by John Henry Cobb.

== Research and career ==
From 1992 to 1994, Thomson was a postdoctoral research fellow in the High Energy Physics group at University College London. In 1994, he joined CERN firstly as a fellow and then as a staff research physicist where he worked on the OPAL experiment. Since 2000, Thomson has worked at the University of Cambridge as a Lecturer (2000–2004), Reader (2004–2008) and Professor of Experimental Particle Physics (2008–present).

From 2015 to 2018, Thomson was the co-leader and co-spokesperson for the Deep Underground Neutrino Experiment (DUNE) in the United States. Thomson also worked on MicroBooNE and the MINOS experiments.

In 2026, Thomson was appointed Honorary Fellow at Pembroke College Oxford.

=== Publications ===
Thomson is the author or co-author of more than 1100 publications in peer reviewed scientific journals covering a number of major areas in High Energy Particle Physics. His main research interests are in electron-positron collider physics, neutrino physics and the development of novel and powerful reconstruction techniques for cutting edge detector technologies. In addition to his research activities, he is the author of the textbook "Modern Particle Physics".
