= Hyperon =

Type of strange baryon

In particle physics, a hyperon is any baryon containing one or more strange quarks, but no charm, bottom, or top quarks. This form of matter may exist in a stable form within the core of some neutron stars. Hyperons are sometimes generically represented by the symbol Y.

== History and research ==
The first research into hyperons happened in the 1950s and spurred physicists on to the creation of an organized classification of particles.

The term was coined by French physicist Louis Leprince-Ringuet in 1953, and announced for the first time at the cosmic ray conference at Bagnères de Bigorre in July of that year, agreed upon by Leprince-Ringuet, Bruno Rossi, C.F. Powell, William B. Fretter and Bernard Peters.

Today, research in this area is carried out on data taken at many facilities around the world, including CERN, Fermilab, SLAC, JLAB, Brookhaven National Laboratory, KEK, GSI and others. Physics topics include searches for CP violation, measurements of spin, studies of excited states (commonly referred to as spectroscopy), and hunts for exotic forms such as pentaquarks and dibaryons.

== Properties and behavior ==
A combination of three u, d or s-quarks with a total spin of 3/2 form the so-called baryon decuplet. The lower six are hyperons.

Being baryons, all hyperons are fermions. That is, they have half-integer spin and obey Fermi–Dirac statistics. Hyperons all interact via the strong nuclear force, making them types of hadron. They are composed of three light quarks, at least one of which is a strange quark, which makes them strange baryons.

Excited hyperon resonances and ground-state hyperons with a '*' included in their notation decay via the strong interaction. For Ω^{−} as well as the lighter hyperons this decay mode is not possible given the particle masses and the conservation of flavor and isospin necessary in strong interactions. Instead, these decay weakly with non-conserved parity. An exception to this is the Σ^{0} which decays electromagnetically into Λ on account of carrying the same flavor quantum numbers. The type of interaction through which these decays occur determine the average lifetime, which is why weakly decaying hyperons are significantly more long-lived than those that decay through strong or electromagnetic interactions.

== List ==
Hyperons
Particle	Symbol	Makeup	Rest mass [MeV/c^{2}]	Isospin, I	Spin, parity, J^{P}	Q [e]	S	C	B′	Mean lifetime [s]	Commonly decays to
Lambda	Λ^{0}	uds	1 115.683(6)	0	1/2^{+}	0	−1	0	0	2.60×10^{−10}	p^{+} + π^{−} or n^{0} + π^{0}
Lambda resonance	Λ(1405)	uds	1405.1+1.3 −1.0	0	1/2^{−}	0	−1	0	0		Σ + π
Lambda resonance	Λ(1520)	uds	1 519(1)	0	3/2^{−}	0	−1	0	0		N + K or Σ + π or Λ + 2π
Sigma	Σ^{+}	uus	1 189.37(7)	1	1/2^{+}	+1	−1	0	0	(8.018±0.026)×10^{−11}	p^{+} + π^{0} or n^{0} + π^{+}
Sigma	Σ^{0}	uds	1 192.642(24)	1	1/2^{+}	0	−1	0	0	(7.4±0.7)×10^{−20}	Λ^{0} + γ
Sigma	Σ^{−}	dds	1 197.449(30)	1	1/2^{+}	−1	−1	0	0	(1.479±0.011)×10^{−10}	n^{0} + π^{−}
Sigma resonance	Σ^{∗+}(1385)	uus	1 382.8(4)	1	3/2^{+}	+1	−1	0	0		Λ + π or Σ + π
Sigma resonance	Σ^{∗0}(1385)	uds	1383.7(1.0)	1	3/2^{+}	0	−1	0	0		Λ + π or Σ + π
Sigma resonance	Σ^{∗−}(1385)	dds	1 387.2(5)	1	3/2^{+}	−1	−1	0	0		Λ + π or Σ + π
Xi	Ξ^{0}	uss	1 314.86(20)	1/2	1/2^{+}	0	−2	0	0	(2.90±0.09)×10^{−10}	Λ^{0} + π^{0}
Xi	Ξ^{−}	dss	1 321.71(7)	1/2	1/2^{+}	−1	−2	0	0	(1.639±0.015)×10^{−10}	Λ^{0} + π^{−}
Xi resonance	Ξ^{∗0}(1530)	uss	1 531.80(32)	1/2	3/2^{+}	0	−2	0	0		Ξ + π
Xi resonance	Ξ^{∗−}(1530)	dss	1 535.0(6)	1/2	3/2^{+}	−1	−2	0	0		Ξ + π
Omega	Ω^{−}	sss	1 672.45(29)	0	3/2^{+}	−1	−3	0	0	(8.21±0.11)×10^{−11}	Λ^{0} + K^{−} or Ξ^{0} + π^{−} or Ξ^{−} + π^{0}

Notes:

- Since strangeness is conserved by the strong interactions, some ground-state hyperons cannot decay strongly. However, they do participate in strong interactions.
- Λ^{0} may also decay on rare occurrences via these processes:
  Λ^{0} → p^{+} + e^{−} + ν̅_{e}
  Λ^{0} → p^{+} + μ^{−} + ν̅_{μ}
- Ξ^{0} and Ξ^{−} are also known as "cascade" hyperons, since they go through a two-step cascading decay into a nucleon.
- The Ω^{−} has a baryon number of +1 and hypercharge of −2, giving it strangeness of −3. It takes multiple flavor-changing weak decays for it to decay into a proton or neutron. Murray Gell-Mann's and Yuval Ne'eman's SU(3) model (sometimes called the Eightfold Way) predicted this hyperon's existence, mass and that it will only undergo weak decay processes. Experimental evidence for its existence was discovered in 1964 at Brookhaven National Laboratory. Further examples of its formation and observation using particle accelerators confirmed the SU(3) model.

== See also ==
- Delta baryon
- Hypernucleus
- Strangelet
- List of baryons
- List of particles
- Physics portal
- Timeline of particle discoveries
