= List of baryons =

Subatomic particles composed of an odd number of quarks

A proton, the only baryon stable in isolation, has two up quarks and one down quark, confined via the exchange of gluons.

Baryons are composite particles made of three quarks, as opposed to mesons, which are composite particles made of an equal number of quarks and antiquarks. Baryons and mesons are both hadrons, which are particles composed solely of quarks or both quarks and antiquarks. The term baryon is derived from the Greek "βαρύς" (barys), meaning "heavy", because, at the time of their naming, it was believed that baryons were characterized by having greater masses than other particles that were classed as matter.

Pentaquarks are exotic baryons composed of four quarks and one antiquark. In 2015, the LHCb collaboration at CERN definitively reported the observation of pentaquark states in the decay of bottom lambda baryons (Λ^{0}_{b}). Since then, additional pentaquark states have been discovered, including new observations in 2019 and 2022. While primarily created in laboratory conditions, pentaquarks might also form naturally during neutron star formation.

Since baryons are composed of quarks, they participate in the strong interaction. Leptons, on the other hand, are not composed of quarks and as such do not participate in the strong interaction. The best known baryons are protons and neutrons, which make up most of the mass of the visible matter in the universe, whereas electrons, the other major component of atoms, are leptons. Each baryon has a corresponding antiparticle, known as an antibaryon, in which quarks are replaced by their corresponding antiquarks. For example, a proton is made of two up quarks and one down quark, while its corresponding antiparticle, the antiproton, is made of two up antiquarks and one down antiquark.

== Baryon properties ==
These lists detail all known and predicted baryons in total angular momentum J = 1/2 and J = 3/2 configurations with positive parity.

- Baryons composed of one type of quark (uuu, ddd, ...) can exist in J = 3/2 configuration, but J = 1/2 is forbidden by the Pauli exclusion principle.
- Baryons composed of two types of quarks (uud, uus, ...) can exist in both J = 1/2 and J = 3/2 configurations.
- Baryons composed of three types of quarks (uds, udc, ...) can exist in both J = 1/2 and J = 3/2 configurations. Two J = 1/2 configurations are possible for these baryons.

The symbols encountered in these lists are: I (isospin), J (total angular momentum), P (parity), u (up quark), d (down quark), s (strange quark), c (charm quark), b (bottom quark), Q (charge), B (baryon number), S (strangeness), C (charm), B′ (bottomness), as well as a wide array of subatomic particles (hover for name). (See Baryon for a detailed explanation of these symbols.)

Antibaryons are not listed in the tables; however, they simply would have all quarks changed to antiquarks, and Q, B, S, C, B′, would be of opposite signs. Particles with ^{†} next to their names have been predicted by the Standard Model but not yet observed. Values in parentheses have not been firmly established by experiments, but are predicted by the quark model and are consistent with the measurements.

=== J^{P} = 1/2^{+} baryons ===
J^{P} = 1/2^{+} baryons
Particle name	Symbol	Quark content	Rest mass [MeV/c^{2}]	I	J^{P}	Q [e]	S	C	B′	Mean lifetime [s]	Commonly decays to
proton	p, p^{+}, N^{+}	uud	938.272088816(29)^{^{[a]}}	1/2	1/2^{+}	+1	0	0	0	stable^{^{[b]}}	unobserved
neutron	n, n^{0}, N^{0}	udd	939.56542052(54)^{^{[a]}}	1/2	1/2^{+}	0	0	0	0	(8.784±0.005)×10^{+2}^{^{[c]}}	p^{+} + e^{−} + ν̅_{e}
lambda	Λ^{0}	uds	1115.683±0.006	0	1/2^{+}	0	−1	0	0	(2.617±0.010)×10^{−10}	p^{+} + π^{−} or n^{0} + π^{0}
charmed lambda	Λ^{+}_{c}	udc	2286.46±0.14	0	1/2^{+}	+1	0	+1	0	(2.024±0.031)×10^{−13}	see Λ^{+}_{c} decay modes
bottom lambda	Λ^{0}_{b}	udb	5619.6±0.17	(0)	(1/2^{+})	0	0	0	−1	(1.471±0.009)×10^{−12}	see Λ^{0}_{b} decay modes
sigma	Σ^{+}	uus	1189.37±0.07	1	1/2^{+}	+1	−1	0	0	(8.018±0.026)×10^{−11}	p^{+} + π^{0} or n^{0} + π^{+}
sigma	Σ^{0}	uds	1192.642±0.024	1	1/2^{+}	0	−1	0	0	(7.4±0.7)×10^{−20}	Λ^{0} + γ
sigma	Σ^{−}	dds	1197.449±0.030	1	1/2^{+}	−1	−1	0	0	(1.479±0.011)×10^{−10}	n^{0} + π^{−}
charmed sigma	Σ^{++}_{c}(2455)	uuc	2453.97±0.14	1	1/2^{+}	+2	0	+1	0	3.48+0.37 −0.16×10^{−22}^{^{[d]}}	Λ^{+}_{c} + π^{+}
charmed sigma	Σ^{+}_{c}(2455)	udc	2452.9±0.4	1	1/2^{+}	+1	0	+1	0	>1.43×10^{−22}^{^{[d]}}	Λ^{+}_{c} + π^{0}
charmed sigma	Σ^{0}_{c}(2455)	ddc	2453.75±0.14	1	1/2^{+}	0	0	+1	0	3.60+0.42 −0.20×10^{−22}^{^{[d]}}	Λ^{+}_{c} + π^{−}
bottom sigma	Σ^{+}_{b}	uub	5810.56±0.25	(1)	(1/2^{+})	+1	0	0	−1	(1.32±0.13)×10^{−22}^{^{[d]}}	Λ^{0}_{b} + π^{+}
bottom sigma^{^{†}}	Σ^{0}_{b}	udb	5 811.8 ± 1.0	(1)	(1/2^{+})	0	0	0	−1	unknown	unknown
bottom sigma	Σ^{−}_{b}	ddb	5815.64±0.27	(1)	(1/2^{+})	−1	0	0	−1	(1.24±0.12)×10^{−22}^{^{[d]}}	Λ^{0}_{b} + π^{−}
xi	Ξ^{0}	uss	1314.86±0.20	1/2	1/2^{(+)}	0	−2	0	0	(2.90±0.09)×10^{−10}	Λ^{0} + π^{0}
xi	Ξ^{−}	dss	1321.71±0.07	1/2	1/2^{(+)}	−1	−2	0	0	(1.639±0.015)×10^{−10}	Λ^{0} + π^{−}
charmed xi	Ξ^{+}_{c}	usc	2467.94+0.17 −0.20	(1/2)	(1/2^{+})	+1	−1	+1	0	(4.56±0.05)×10^{−13}	see Ξ^{+}_{c} decay modes
charmed xi	Ξ^{0}_{c}	dsc	2470.90+0.22 −0.29	(1/2)	(1/2^{+})	0	−1	+1	0	(1.53±0.06)×10^{−13}	see Ξ^{0}_{c} decay modes
charmed xi prime	Ξ′^{+}_{c}	usc	2578.4±0.5	(1/2)	(1/2^{+})	+1	−1	+1	0	unknown	Ξ^{+}_{c} + γ (seen)
charmed xi prime	Ξ′^{0}_{c}	dsc	2579.2±0.5	(1/2)	(1/2^{+})	0	−1	+1	0	unknown	Ξ^{0}_{c} + γ (seen)
double charmed xi	Ξ^{++}_{cc}	ucc	3621.2±0.7	(1/2)	(1/2^{+})	+2	0	+2	0	unknown	see Ξ^{++}_{cc} decay modes
double charmed xi	Ξ^{+}_{cc}	dcc	3612.0+1.9 −1.3	(1/2)	(1/2^{+})	+1	0	+2	0	unknown	Λ^{+}_{c} + K^{−} + π^{+} (seen)
bottom xi or cascade B	Ξ^{0}_{b}	usb	5791.9±0.5	(1/2)	(1/2^{+})	0	−1	0	−1	(1.480±0.030)×10^{−12}	see Ξ^{0}_{b} decay modes
bottom xi or cascade B	Ξ^{−}_{b}	dsb	5797.0±0.6	(1/2)	(1/2^{+})	−1	−1	0	−1	(1.572±0.040)×10^{−12}	see Ξ^{−}_{b} decay modes
bottom xi prime^{†}	Ξ′^{0}_{b}	usb	unknown	(1/2)	(1/2^{+})	0	−1	0	−1	unknown	unknown
bottom xi prime^{†}	Ξ′^{−}_{b}	dsb	unknown	(1/2)	(1/2^{+})	−1	−1	0	−1	unknown	unknown
double bottom xi^{†}	Ξ^{0}_{bb}	ubb	unknown	(1/2)	(1/2^{+})	0	0	0	−2	unknown	unknown
double bottom xi^{†}	Ξ^{−}_{bb}	dbb	unknown	(1/2)	(1/2^{+})	−1	0	0	−2	unknown	unknown
charmed bottom xi^{†}	Ξ^{+}_{cb}	ucb	unknown	(1/2)	(1/2^{+})	+1	0	+1	−1	unknown	unknown
charmed bottom xi^{†}	Ξ^{0}_{cb}	dcb	unknown	(1/2)	(1/2^{+})	0	0	+1	−1	unknown	unknown
charmed bottom xi prime^{†}	Ξ′^{+}_{cb}	ucb	unknown	(1/2)	(1/2^{+})	+1	0	+1	−1	unknown	unknown
charmed bottom xi prime^{†}	Ξ′^{0}_{cb}	dcb	unknown	(1/2)	(1/2^{+})	0	0	+1	−1	unknown	unknown
charmed omega	Ω^{0}_{c}	ssc	2695.2±1.7	(0)	(1/2^{+})	0	−2	+1	0	(2.68±0.24 ± 0.10)×10^{−13}	see Ω^{0}_{c} decay modes
bottom omega	Ω^{−}_{b}	ssb	6046.1±1.7	(0)	(1/2^{+})	−1	−2	0	−1	1.64+0.18 −0.17×10^{−12}	Ω^{−} + J/ψ (seen)
double charmed omega	Ω^{+}_{cc}	scc	3727	(0)	(1/2^{+})	+1	−1	+2	0	unknown	unknown
charmed bottom omega^{†}	Ω^{0}_{cb}	scb	unknown	(0)	(1/2^{+})	0	−1	+1	−1	unknown	unknown
charmed bottom omega prime^{†}	Ω′^{0}_{cb}	scb	unknown	(0)	(1/2^{+})	0	−1	+1	−1	unknown	unknown
double bottom omega^{†}	Ω^{−}_{bb}	sbb	unknown	(0)	(1/2^{+})	−1	−1	0	−2	unknown	unknown
double charmed bottom omega^{†}	Ω^{+}_{ccb}	ccb	unknown	(0)	(1/2^{+})	+1	0	+2	−1	unknown	unknown
charmed double bottom omega^{†}	Ω^{0}_{cbb}	cbb	unknown	(0)	(1/2^{+})	0	0	+1	−2	unknown	unknown

^{†} Particle has not yet been observed.
^{[a]} The masses of the proton and neutron are known with much better precision in daltons (Da) than in MeV/c^{2}. In atomic mass units, the mass of the proton is 1.0072764665789(83) Da whereas that of the neutron is 1.00866491606(40) Da.
^{[b]} At least 10^{35} years. See Proton decay.
^{[c]} For free neutrons; in most common nuclei, neutrons are stable.
^{[d]} PDG reports the resonance width (Γ). Here the conversion τ = ħ/Γ is given instead.

=== J^{P} = 3/2^{+} baryons ===
J^{P} = 3/2^{+} baryons
Particle name	Symbol	Quark content	Rest mass [MeV/c^{2}]	I	J^{P}	Q [e]	S	C	B′	Mean lifetime [s]	Commonly decays to
delta	Δ^{++}(1232)	uuu	1232±2	3/2	3/2^{+}	+2	0	0	0	(5.63±0.14)×10^{−24}^{^{[h]}}	p^{+} + π^{+}
delta	Δ^{+}(1232)	uud	1232±2	3/2	3/2^{+}	+1	0	0	0	(5.63±0.14)×10^{−24}^{^{[h]}}	p^{+} + π^{0} or n^{0} + π^{+}
delta	Δ^{0}(1232)	udd	1232±2	3/2	3/2^{+}	0	0	0	0	(5.63±0.14)×10^{−24}^{^{[h]}}	n^{0} + π^{0} or p^{+} + π^{−}
delta	Δ^{−}(1232)	ddd	1232±2	3/2	3/2^{+}	−1	0	0	0	(5.63±0.14)×10^{−24}^{^{[h]}}	n^{0} + π^{−}
sigma	Σ^{∗+}(1385)	uus	1382.80±0.35	1	3/2^{+}	+1	−1	0	0	(1.828±0.036)×10^{−23}^{^{[h]}}	Λ^{0} + π^{+} or Σ^{+} + π^{0} or Σ^{0} + π^{+}
sigma	Σ^{∗0}(1385)	uds	1383.7±1.0	1	3/2^{+}	0	−1	0	0	(1.83±0.26)×10^{−23}^{^{[h]}}	Λ^{0} + π^{0} or Σ^{+} + π^{−} or Σ^{0} + π^{0}
sigma	Σ^{∗−}(1385)	dds	1387.2±0.5	1	3/2^{+}	−1	−1	0	0	(1.671±0.089)×10^{−23}^{^{[h]}}	Λ^{0} + π^{−} or Σ^{0} + π^{−} or Σ^{−} + π^{0}
charmed sigma	Σ^{∗++}_{c}(2520)	uuc	2518.41+0.21 −0.19	1	(3/2^{+})	+2	0	+1	0	4.45+0.12 −0.09×10^{−23}^{^{[h]}}	Λ^{+}_{c} + π^{+}
charmed sigma	Σ^{∗+}_{c}(2520)	udc	2517.5±2.3	1	(3/2^{+})	+1	0	+1	0	>3.87×10^{−23}^{^{[h]}}	Λ^{+}_{c} + π^{0}
charmed sigma	Σ^{∗0}_{c}(2520)	ddc	2518.48±0.20	1	(3/2^{+})	0	0	+1	0	4.30+0.15 −0.11×10^{−23}^{^{[h]}}	Λ^{+}_{c} + π^{−}
bottom sigma	Σ^{∗+}_{b}	uub	5830.32±0.27	(1)	(3/2^{+})	+1	0	0	−1	(7.0±0.4)×10^{−23}^{^{[h]}}	Λ^{0}_{b} + π^{+}
bottom sigma^{^{[e]}}	Σ^{∗0}_{b}	udb	unknown	(1)	(3/2^{+})	0	0	0	−1	unknown	unknown
bottom sigma	Σ^{∗−}_{b}	ddb	5834.74±0.30	(1)	(3/2^{+})	−1	0	0	−1	(6.3±0.5)×10^{−23}^{^{[h]}}	Λ^{0}_{b} + π^{−}
xi	Ξ^{∗0}(1530)	uss	1531.80±0.32	1/2	3/2^{+}	0	−2	0	0	(7.23±0.40)×10^{−23}^{^{[h]}}	Ξ^{0} + π^{0} or Ξ^{−} + π^{+}
xi	Ξ^{∗−}(1530)	dss	1535.0±0.6	1/2	3/2^{+}	−1	−2	0	0	6.6+1.3 −1.1×10^{−23}^{^{[h]}}	Ξ^{0} + π^{−} or Ξ^{−} + π^{0}
charmed xi	Ξ^{∗+}_{c}(2645)	usc	2645.56+0.24 −0.30	(1/2)	(3/2^{+})	+1	−1	+1	0	(3.08±0.28)×10^{−22}^{^{[h]}}	Ξ^{+}_{c} + π^{0} (seen)
charmed xi	Ξ^{∗0}_{c}(2645)	dsc	2646.38+0.20 −0.23	(1/2)	(3/2^{+})	0	−1	+1	0	(2.80±0.22 ± 0.16)×10^{−22}^{^{[h]}}	Ξ^{+}_{c} + π^{−} (seen)
double charmed xi^{†}	Ξ^{∗++}_{cc}	ucc	unknown	(1/2)	(3/2^{+})	+2	0	+2	0	unknown	unknown
double charmed xi^{†}	Ξ^{∗+}_{cc}	dcc	unknown	(1/2)	(3/2^{+})	+1	0	+2	0	unknown	unknown
bottom xi	Ξ^{∗0}_{b}	usb	5952.3±0.6	(1/2)	(3/2^{+})	0	−1	0	−1	(7.31±1.34 ± 0.66)×10^{−22}^{^{[h]}}	Ξ^{−}_{b} + π^{+} (seen)
bottom xi	Ξ^{∗−}_{b}	dsb	5955.33±0.12 ± 0.05	(1/2)	(3/2^{+})	−1	−1	0	−1	(3.99±0.78 ± 0.24)×10^{−22}^{^{[h]}}	Ξ^{0}_{b} + π^{−} (seen)
double bottom xi^{†}	Ξ^{∗0}_{bb}	ubb	unknown	(1/2)	(3/2^{+})	0	0	0	−2	unknown	unknown
double bottom xi^{†}	Ξ^{∗−}_{bb}	dbb	unknown	(1/2)	(3/2^{+})	−1	0	0	−2	unknown	unknown
charmed bottom xi^{†}	Ξ^{∗+}_{cb}	ucb	unknown	(1/2)	(3/2^{+})	+1	0	+1	−1	unknown	unknown
charmed bottom xi^{†}	Ξ^{∗0}_{cb}	dcb	unknown	(1/2)	(3/2^{+})	0	0	+1	−1	unknown	unknown
omega	Ω^{−}	sss	1672.45±0.29	0	3/2^{+}	−1	−3	0	0	(8.21±0.11)×10^{−11}^{^{[h]}}	Λ^{0} + K^{−} or Ξ^{0} + π^{−} or Ξ^{−} + π^{0}
charmed omega	Ω^{∗0}_{c}(2770)	ssc	2765.9±2.0	0	(3/2^{+})	0	−2	+1	0	unknown	Ω^{0}_{c} + γ
bottom omega^{†}	Ω^{∗−}_{b}	ssb	unknown	(0)	(3/2^{+})	−1	−2	0	−1	unknown	unknown
double charmed omega^{†}	Ω^{∗+}_{cc}	scc	unknown	(0)	(3/2^{+})	+1	−1	+2	0	unknown	unknown
charmed bottom omega^{†}	Ω^{∗0}_{cb}	scb	unknown	(0)	(3/2^{+})	0	−1	+1	−1	unknown	unknown
double bottom omega^{†}	Ω^{∗−}_{bb}	sbb	unknown	(0)	(3/2^{+})	−1	−1	0	−2	unknown	unknown
triple charmed omega^{†}	Ω^{++}_{ccc}	ccc	unknown	(0)	(3/2^{+})	+2	0	+3	0	unknown	unknown
double charmed bottom omega^{†}	Ω^{∗+}_{ccb}	ccb	unknown	(0)	(3/2^{+})	+1	0	+2	−1	unknown	unknown
charmed double bottom omega^{†}	Ω^{∗0}_{cbb}	cbb	unknown	(0)	(3/2^{+})	0	0	+1	−2	unknown	unknown
triple bottom omega^{†}	Ω^{−}_{bbb}	bbb	unknown	(0)	(3/2^{+})	−1	0	0	−3	unknown	unknown

^{†} Particle has not yet been observed.
^{[h]} PDG reports the resonance width (Γ). Here the conversion τ = ħ/Γ is given instead.

=== Baryon resonance particles ===
This table gives the name, quantum numbers (where known), and experimental status of baryon resonances confirmed by the PDG. Baryon resonance particles (including all not in the above two tables) are excited baryon states with short half lives and higher masses. Despite significant research, the fundamental degrees of freedom behind baryon excitation spectra are still poorly understood. The spin-parity J^{P} (when known) is given with each particle. For the strongly decaying particles, the J^{P} values are considered to be part of the names, as is the mass for all resonances.

Baryon resonance particles
Nucleons			Δ particles			Λ particles			Σ particles			Ξ and Ω particles			Charmed particles			Bottom particles		
p	1/2^{+}	****	Δ(1232)	3/2^{+}	****	Λ	1/2^{+}	****	Σ^{+}	1/2^{+}	****	Ξ^{0}	1/2^{+}	****	Λ^{+}_{c}	1/2^{+}	****	Λ^{0}_{b}	1/2^{+}	***
n	1/2^{+}	****	Δ(1600)	3/2^{+}	****	Λ(1405)	1/2^{−}	****	Σ^{0}	1/2^{+}	****	Ξ^{−}	1/2^{+}	****	Λ_{c}(2595)^{+}	1/2^{−}	***	Λ_{b}(5912)^{0}	1/2^{−}	***
N(1440)	1/2^{+}	****	Δ(1620)	1/2^{−}	****	Λ(1520)	3/2^{−}	****	Σ^{−}	1/2^{+}	****	Ξ(1530)	3/2^{+}	****	Λ_{c}(2625)^{+}	3/2^{−}	***	Λ_{b}(5920)^{0}	3/2^{−}	***
N(1520)	3/2^{−}	****	Δ(1700)	3/2^{−}	****	Λ(1600)	1/2^{+}	***	Σ(1385)	3/2^{+}	****	Ξ(1620)		*	Λ_{c}(2765)^{+}		*	Σ_{b}	1/2^{+}	***
N(1535)	1/2^{−}	****	Δ(1750)	1/2^{+}	*	Λ(1670)	1/2^{−}	****	Σ(1480)		*	Ξ(1690)		***	Λ_{c}(2860)^{+}	3/2^{+}	***	Σ^{*}_{b}	3/2^{+}	***
N(1650)	1/2^{−}	****	Δ(1900)	1/2^{−}	***	Λ(1690)	3/2^{−}	****	Σ(1560)		**	Ξ(1820)	3/2^{−}	***	Λ_{c}(2880)^{+}	5/2^{+}	***	Ξ^{0}_{b}, Ξ^{−}_{b}	1/2^{+}	***
N(1675)	5/2^{−}	****	Δ(1905)	5/2^{+}	****	Λ(1710)	1/2^{+}	*	Σ(1580)	3/2^{−}	*	Ξ(1950)		***	Λ_{c}(2940)^{+}	3/2^{−}	***	Ξ'_{b}(5935)^{−}	1/2^{+}	***
N(1680)	5/2^{+}	****	Δ(1910)	1/2^{+}	****	Λ(1800)	1/2^{−}	***	Σ(1620)	1/2^{−}	*	Ξ(2030)	≥ 5/2?	***	Σ_{c}(2455)	1/2^{+}	****	Ξ_{b}(5945)^{0}	3/2^{+}	***
N(1700)	3/2^{−}	***	Δ(1920)	3/2^{+}	***	Λ(1810)	1/2^{+}	***	Σ(1660)	1/2^{+}	***	Ξ(2120)		*	Σ_{c}(2520)	3/2^{+}	***	Ξ_{b}(5955)^{−}	3/2^{+}	***
N(1710)	1/2^{+}	****	Δ(1930)	5/2^{−}	***	Λ(1820)	5/2^{+}	****	Σ(1670)	3/2^{−}	****	Ξ(2250)		**	Σ_{c}(2800)		***	Ω^{−}_{b}	1/2^{+}	***
N(1720)	3/2^{+}	****	Δ(1940)	3/2^{−}	**	Λ(1830)	5/2^{−}	****	Σ(1690)		**	Ξ(2370)		**				P_{c}(4380)^{+}		*
N(1860)	5/2^{+}	**	Δ(1950)	7/2^{+}	****	Λ(1890)	3/2^{+}	****	Σ(1730)	3/2^{+}	*	Ξ(2500)		*	Ξ^{+}_{c}	1/2^{+}	***	P_{c}(4450)^{+}		*
N(1875)	3/2^{−}	***	Δ(2000)	5/2^{+}	**	Λ(2000)		*	Σ(1750)	1/2^{−}	***				Ξ^{0}_{c}	1/2^{+}	***			
N(1880)	1/2^{+}	***	Δ(2150)	1/2^{−}	*	Λ(2020)	7/2^{+}	*	Σ(1770)	1/2^{+}	*	Ω^{−}	3/2^{+}	****	Ξ′^{+}_{c}	1/2^{+}	***			
N(1895)	1/2^{−}	****	Δ(2200)	7/2^{−}	***	Λ(2050)	3/2^{−}	*	Σ(1775)	5/2^{−}	****	Ω(2250)^{−}		***	Ξ′^{0}_{c}	1/2^{+}	***			
N(1900)	3/2^{+}	****	Δ(2300)	9/2^{+}	**	Λ(2100)	7/2^{−}	****	Σ(1840)	3/2^{+}	*	Ω(2380)^{−}		**	Ξ_{c}(2645)	3/2^{+}	***			
N(1990)	7/2^{+}	**	Δ(2350)	5/2^{−}	*	Λ(2110)	5/2^{+}	***	Σ(1880)	1/2^{+}	**	Ω(2470)^{−}		**	Ξ_{c}(2790)	1/2^{−}	***			
N(2000)	5/2^{+}	**	Δ(2390)	7/2^{+}	*	Λ(2325)	3/2^{−}	*	Σ(1900)	1/2^{−}	*				Ξ_{c}(2815)	3/2^{−}	***			
N(2040)	3/2^{+}	*	Δ(2400)	9/2^{−}	**	Λ(2350)	9/2^{+}	***	Σ(1915)	5/2^{+}	****				Ξ_{c}(2930)		*			
N(2060)	5/2^{−}	***	Δ(2420)	11/2^{+}	****	Λ(2585)		**	Σ(1940)	3/2^{+}	*				Ξ_{c}(2980)		***			
N(2100)	1/2^{+}	***	Δ(2750)	13/2^{−}	**				Σ(1940)	3/2^{−}	***				Ξ_{c}(3055)		***			
N(2120)	3/2^{−}	***	Δ(2950)	15/2^{+}	**				Σ(2000)	1/2^{−}	*				Ξ_{c}(3080)		***			
N(2190)	7/2^{−}	****							Σ(2030)	7/2^{+}	****				Ξ_{c}(3123)		*			
N(2220)	9/2^{+}	****							Σ(2070)	5/2^{+}	*									
N(2250)	9/2^{−}	****							Σ(2080)	3/2^{+}	**				Ω^{0}_{c}	1/2^{+}	***			
N(2300)	1/2^{+}	**							Σ(2100)	7/2^{−}	*				Ω_{c}(2770)^{0}	3/2^{+}	***			
N(2570)	5/2^{−}	**							Σ(2250)		***				Ω_{c}(3000)^{0}		***			
N(2600)	11/2^{−}	***							Σ(2455)		**				Ω_{c}(3050)^{0}		***			
N(2700)	13/2^{+}	**							Σ(2620)		**				Ω_{c}(3065)^{0}		***			
									Σ(3000)		*				Ω_{c}(3090)^{0}		***			
															Ω_{c}(3120)^{0}		***			
															Ξ^{+}_{cc}		*			
															Ξ^{++}_{cc}		***			

****	Existence is certain, and properties are at least fairly well explored.
***	Existence ranges from fairly certain to certain, but further confirmation is desirable, and/or quantum numbers, branching fractions, etc. are not well determined.
**	Evidence of existence is only fair.
*	Evidence of existence is poor.

== See also ==
- Baryons
- Eightfold way (physics)
- List of mesons
- List of particles
- Resonance (particle physics)
- Roper resonance
- Timeline of particle discoveries
