= Omega baryon =

Subatomic hadron particle

Bubble chamber trace of the first observed Ω baryon event at Brookhaven National Laboratory, adapted from original tracing. The tracks of neutral particles (dashed lines) are not visible in the bubble chamber. The collision of a K^{−} meson with a proton creates an Ω^{−}, a K^{0} and a K^{+}. The Ω^{−} decays into a π^{−} and a Ξ^{0}, which in turn decays into a Λ^{0} and a π^{0}. The Λ^{0} decays into a proton and a π^{−}. The π^{0}, invisible due to its short lifetime, decays into two photons (γ), which in turn each create an electron-positron pair.

Omega baryons (often called simply omega particles) are a family of subatomic hadrons which are represented by the symbol Ω and are either charge neutral or have a +2, +1 or −1 elementary charge. Additionally, they contain no up or down quarks. Omega baryons containing top quarks are also not expected to be observed. This is because the Standard Model predicts the mean lifetime of top quarks to be roughly 5×10^{−25} s, which is about a twentieth of the timescale necessary for the strong interactions required for hadronization, the process by which hadrons form from quarks and gluons.

The earliest observed omega baryon was the Ω^{−}, made of three strange quarks. It was first observed in 1964. The discovery was a great triumph in the study of quarks, since it was discovered experimentally after its existence, mass, and decay products had been predicted in 1961 by Susumu Okubo and independently by Murray Gell-Mann in a less accurate formula, based on a missing slot in the eightfold way hadron classification scheme. A charmed omega particle (Ω^{0}_{c}) was discovered in 1985, in which a strange quark is replaced by a charm quark. The Ω^{−} decays only via the weak interaction and therefore has a relatively long lifetime. Spin (J) and parity (P) values for unobserved baryons are predicted by the quark model.

Since omega baryons do not have any up or down quarks, they all have isospin 0.

The naming convention of baryons has become such that those with no light (i.e. up or down) valence quarks are called omega baryons. By default, the quarks are strange quarks, but those with one or more the strange quarks replaced by charm or bottom quarks have a subscript c or b, respectively.

== Omega baryons ==
Quark structure of omega baryon (Ω^{−})

Omega
Particle	Symbol	Quark content	Rest mass (MeV/c^{2})	J^{P}	Q (e)	S	C	B'	Mean lifetime (s)	Decays to
Omega	Ω^{−}	sss	1672.45±0.29	3/2^{+}	−1	−3	0	0	(8.21±0.11)×10^{−11}	Λ^{0} + K^{−} or Ξ^{0} + π^{−} or Ξ^{−} + π^{0}
Charmed omega	Ω^{0}_{c}	ssc	2697.5±2.6	1/2^{+}	0	−2	+1	0	(2.68±0.24)×10^{−13}	See Ω^{0}_{c} Decay Modes
Bottom omega	Ω^{−}_{b}	ssb	6054.4±6.8	1/2^{+}	−1	−2	0	−1	(1.13±0.53)×10^{−12}	Ω^{−} + J/ψ (seen)
Double charmed omega	Ω^{+}_{cc}	scc	3725.9±1.2	1/2^{+}	+1	−1	+2	0		
Charmed bottom omega†	Ω^{0}_{cb}	scb		1/2^{+}	0	−1	+1	−1		
Double bottom omega†	Ω^{−}_{bb}	sbb		1/2^{+}	−1	−1	0	−2		
Triple charmed omega†	Ω^{++}_{ccc}	ccc		3/2^{+}	+2	0	+3	0		
Double charmed bottom omega†	Ω^{+}_{ccb}	ccb		1/2^{+}	+1	0	+2	−1		
Charmed double bottom omega†	Ω^{0}_{cbb}	cbb		1/2^{+}	0	0	+1	−2		
Triple bottom omega†	Ω^{−}_{bbb}	bbb		3/2^{+}	−1	0	0	−3		

† Particle (or quantity, i.e. spin) has neither been observed nor indicated.

== Recent discoveries ==
The Ω^{−}_{b} particle is a "doubly strange" baryon containing two strange quarks and a bottom quark. A discovery of this particle was first claimed in September 2008 by physicists working on the DØ experiment at the Tevatron facility of the Fermi National Accelerator Laboratory. However, the reported mass of 6165±16 MeV/c^{2} was significantly higher than expected in the quark model. The apparent discrepancy from the Standard Model has since been dubbed the "Ω_{b} puzzle". In May 2009, the CDF collaboration made public their results on the search for the Ω^{−}_{b} based on analysis of a data sample roughly four times the size of the one used by the DØ experiment. CDF measured the mass to be 6054.4±6.8 MeV/c^{2}, which was in excellent agreement with the Standard Model prediction. No signal has been observed at the DØ reported value. The two results differ by 111±18 MeV/c^{2}, which is equivalent to 6.2 standard deviations and are therefore inconsistent. Excellent agreement between the CDF measured mass and theoretical expectations is a strong indication that the particle discovered by CDF is indeed the Ω^{−}_{b}. In February 2013 the LHCb collaboration published a measurement of the Ω^{−}_{b} mass that is consistent with, but more precise than, the CDF result.

In March 2017, the LHCb collaboration announced the observation of five new narrow Ω^{0}_{c} states decaying to Ξ^{+}_{c}K^{−}, where the Ξ^{+}_{c} was reconstructed in the decay mode pK^{−}π^{+}. The states are named Ω_{c}(3000)^{0}, Ω_{c}(3050)^{0}, Ω_{c}(3066)^{0}, Ω_{c}(3090)^{0} and Ω_{c}(3119)^{0}. Their masses and widths were reported, but their quantum numbers could not be determined due to the large background present in the sample.

In June 2026 the LHCb collaboration announced the observation of the Ω^{+}_{cc} with the mass of about 3727 MeV/c^{2}. The discovery was based on 2024 data accumulated with the upgraded detector and was the third spin 1/2 doubly charmed baryon to be discovered, all by LHCb, completing this SU(4) multiplet of baryons.

== See also ==
- Delta baryon
- Hyperon
- Lambda baryon
- List of mesons
- List of particles
- Nucleon
- Physics portal
- Sigma baryon
- Timeline of particle discoveries
- Xi baryon
