= Xi baryon =

Subatomic particle

- Composition: Ξ^{0}: uss; Ξ^{−}: dss
- Statistics: Fermionic
- Family: Baryons
- Interactions: Strong, weak, electromagnetic, and gravity
- Types: 2
- Mass: Ξ^{0}: 1314.86±0.20 MeV/c^{2}; Ξ^{−}: 1321.71±0.07 MeV/c^{2}
- Spin: 1/2
- Strangeness: -2
- Isospin: 1/2

The Xi baryons or cascade particles are a family of subatomic hadron particles which have the symbol Ξ and may have an electric charge (Q) of +2 e, +1 e, 0, or −1 e, where e is the elementary charge.

Like all conventional baryons, Ξ particles contain three quarks. Ξ baryons, in particular, contain either one up or one down quark and two other, more massive quarks. The two more massive quarks are any two of strange, charm, or bottom (doubles allowed). For notation, the assumption is that the two heavy quarks in the Ξ are both strange; subscripts "c" and "b" are added for each even heavier charm or bottom quark that replaces one of the two presumed strange quarks.

They are historically called the cascade particles because of their unstable state; they are typically observed to decay rapidly into lighter particles, through a chain of decays (cascading decays). The first discovery of a charged Xi baryon was in cosmic ray experiments by the Manchester group in 1952. The first discovery of the neutral Xi particle was at Lawrence Berkeley Laboratory in 1959. It was also observed as a daughter product from the decay of the omega baryon (Ω^{−}) observed at Brookhaven National Laboratory in 1964. The Xi spectrum is important to nonperturbative quantum chromodynamics (QCD), such as lattice QCD.

== History ==
The Ξ^{−}_{b} particle is also known as the cascade B particle and contains quarks from all three families. It was discovered by DØ and CDF experiments at Fermilab. The discovery was announced on 12 June 2007. It was the first known particle made of quarks from all three quark generations – namely, a down quark, a strange quark, and a bottom quark. The DØ and CDF collaborations reported the consistent masses of the new state. The Particle Data Group world average mass is 5.7924±0.0030 GeV/c^{2}.

For notation, the assumption is that the two heavy quarks are both strange, denoted by a simple Ξ ; a subscript "c" is added for each constituent charm quark, and a "b" for each bottom quark. Hence Ξ_{c}, Ξ_{b}, Ξ_{cc}, Ξ_{cb}, etc. Unless specified, the non-up/down quark content of Xi baryons is strange (i.e. there is one up or down quark and two strange quarks). However a Ξ^{0}_{b} contains one up, one strange, and one bottom quark, while a Ξ^{0}_{bb} contains one up and two bottom quarks.

In 2012, the CMS experiment at the Large Hadron Collider detected a Ξ^{∗0}_{b} baryon (reported mass 5945±2.8 MeV/c^{2}). (Here,"*" indicates a baryon decuplet.) The LHCb experiment at CERN discovered two new Xi baryons in 2014: Ξ′^{−}_{b} and Ξ^{∗−}_{b}.

In 2017, the LHCb researchers reported yet another Xi baryon: the double charmed Ξ^{++}_{cc} baryon, consisting of two heavy charm quarks and one up quark. The mass of Ξ^{++}_{cc} is about 3.8 times that of a proton.

The discovery of the Ξ^{+}_{cc} baryon, composed of two charm quarks and one down quark, was announced by the LHCb collaboration in March 2026. Its mass was confirmed to be similar to the mass of the baryon Ξ^{++}_{cc} , which is expected from isospin symmetry.

== List of Xi baryons ==
Isospin and spin values in parentheses have not been firmly established by experiments, but are predicted by the quark model and are consistent with the measurements.

Xi baryons
Particle	Symbol	Makeup	Rest mass (MeV/c^{2})	Isospin, I	Spin, parity, J^{P}	Q	S	C	B	Mean lifetime (s)	Decays to
Xi	Ξ^{0}	uss	1314.86±0.20	1/2	1/2^{(+)}	0	−2	0	0	(2.90±0.09)×10^{−10}	Λ^{0} + π^{0}
Xi	Ξ^{−}	dss	1321.71±0.07	1/2	1/2^{(+)}	−1	−2	0	0	(1.639±0.015)×10^{−10}	Λ^{0} + π^{−}
Xi resonance	Ξ^{0}(1530)	uss	1531.80±0.32	1/2	3/2^{+}	0	−2	0	0	(7.2±0.4)×10^{−23} (Note: The resonance width (Γ) was reported for this species. Here the conversion τ = ħ/Γ is given instead.)	Ξ + π
Xi resonance	Ξ^{−}(1530)	dss	1535.0±0.6	1/2	3/2^{+}	−1	−2	0	0	6.6+1.6 −1.0×10^{−23}	Ξ + π
charmed Xi	Ξ^{+}_{c}	usc	2467.9±0.4	1/2	(1/2 ^{+})	+1	−1	+1	0	(4.42±0.26)×10^{−13}	See Ξ^{+}_{c} decay modes
charmed Xi	Ξ^{0}_{c}	dsc	2471.0±0.4	1/2	(1/2 ^{+})	0	−1	+1	0	1.12+0.13 −0.10×10^{−13}	See Ξ^{0}_{c} decay modes
charmed Xi resonance	Ξ′^{+}_{c}	usc	2575.7±3.1	1/2	(1/2^{+})	+1	−1	+1	0		Ξ^{+}_{c} + γ (Seen)
charmed Xi resonance	Ξ′^{0}_{c}	dsc	2578.0±2.9	1/2	(1/2^{+})	0	−1	+1	0		Ξ^{0}_{c} + γ (Seen)
double charmed Xi	Ξ^{++}_{cc}	ucc	3621.40±0.72 ± 0.27 ± 0.14	(1/2)	(1/2 ^{+})	+2	0	+2	0	0.256+0.024 −0.022 ±0.014×10^{−12}	Λ^{+}_{c} + K^{−} + π^{+} + π^{+}
double charmed Xi (Note: Some controversy exists about this data. See references)	Ξ^{+}_{cc}	dcc	3518.9±0.9	(1/2)	(1/2 ^{+})	+1	0	+2	0	<3.3×10^{−14}	Λ^{+}_{c} + K^{−} + π^{+}^{[e]} or p^{+} + D^{+} + K^{−}^{[e]}
bottom Xi	Ξ^{0}_{b}	usb	5792±3	(1/2)	(1/2 ^{+})	0	−1	0	−1	1.42+0.28 −0.24×10^{−12} (Note: This is actually a measurement of the average lifetime of b-baryons that decay to a jet containing a same-sign Ξ^{±} ℓ^{±} pair. Presumably the mix is mainly Ξ_{b}, with some Λ_{b}.)	See Ξ_{b} decay modes
bottom Xi or Cascade B	Ξ^{−}_{b}	dsb	5792.9±3.0	(1/2)	(1/2 ^{+})	−1	−1	0	−1	1.42×10^{−12}	See Ξ_{b} decay modes ( Ξ^{−} + J/ψ was also seen)
	Ξ′^{−}_{b}	dsb	5935.02±0.02 ± 0.01 ± 0.50		1/2+	−1	−1	0	−1	>8×10^{−21}	
	Ξ^{∗−}_{b}	dsb	5955.33±0.12 ± 0.06 ± 0.50		3/2+	−1	−1	0	−1	(3.99±0.75 ± 0.25)×10^{−22}	
	Ξ_{b}(6227)^{−}	dsb	6226.9±2.0 ± 0.3 ± 0.2			−1	−1	0	−1	3.64+1.55 −0.84 ±0.36×10^{−23}	Λ_{b} + K^{−} Ξ^{0}_{b} + π^{−}
double bottom Xi (Note: Particle (or quantity, i.e. spin) has neither been observed nor indicated)	Ξ^{0}_{bb}	ubb		(1/2)	(1/2 ^{+})	0	0	0	−2		
double bottom Xi	Ξ^{−}_{bb}	dbb		(1/2)	(1/2 ^{+})	−1	0	0	−2		
charmed bottom Xi	Ξ^{+}_{cb}	ucb		(1/2)	(1/2) ^{+}	+1	0	+1	−1		
charmed bottom Xi	Ξ^{0}_{cb}	dcb		(1/2)	(1/2 ^{+})	0	0	+1	−1		

Table notes

== See also ==
- Delta baryon
- Hyperon
- Lambda baryon
- List of baryons
- List of mesons
- List of particles
- Nucleon
- Omega baryon
- Sigma baryon
- Timeline of particle discoveries
