= Ξcc++ =

Charmed particle

$\Xi_{\rm{cc}}^{{++}}$
- Classification: Hadron; Baryon
- Statistics: Fermion
- Mass: 3621.4 MeV/c^{2}
- Mean lifetime: between 5.0×10^{−14} and 1.0×10^{−12}

The Xi double-charm baryon, denoted as $\Xi_{\rm{cc}}^{{++}}$, is a Xi baryon composed of two charm quarks and one up quark.

Its discovery by the LHCb Collaboration was announced on 6 July 2017 in Venice, Italy, at the European Physical Society Conference on High Energy Physics. $\Xi_{\rm{cc}}^{{++}}$ is the first baryon discovered with two heavy quarks (charm and/or bottom) and a light quark. Its mass is 3621 MeV/c^{2}, nearly four times that of the proton.

It was identified when it disintegrated into a $\Lambda_{\rm{c}}^{{+}}$ baryon and three lighter mesons, K^{–}, π^{+} and π^{+}.

== See also ==
- List of baryons
