= Tevatron =

Defunct American particle accelerator at Fermilab in Illinois (1983–2011)

Coordinates: 41.832°N 88.252°W

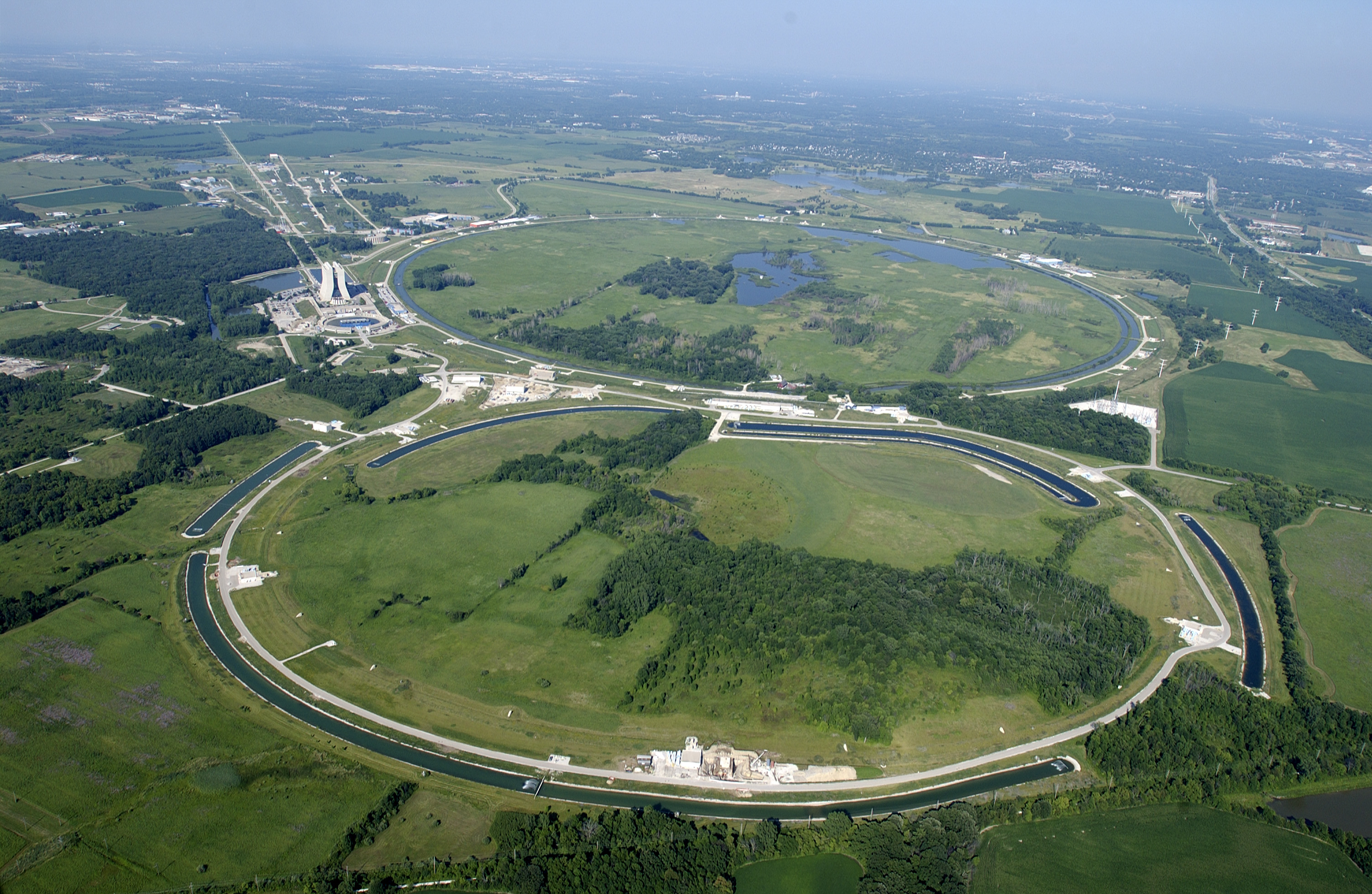
- The Tevatron (background) and Main Injector rings

General properties
- Accelerator type: Synchrotron
- Beam type: Proton, antiproton
- Target type: Collider

Beam properties
- Maximum energy: 1 TeV
- Maximum luminosity: 4×10^{32}/(cm^{2}⋅s)

Physical properties
- Circumference: 6.28 km (3.90 mi)
- Location: Batavia, Illinois
- Institution: Fermilab
- Dates of operation: 1983–2011

The Tevatron was a circular particle accelerator (active until 2011) in the United States, at the Fermi National Accelerator Laboratory (called Fermilab), east of Batavia, Illinois, and was the highest energy particle collider until the Large Hadron Collider (LHC) of the European Organization for Nuclear Research (CERN) was built near Geneva, Switzerland. The Tevatron was a synchrotron that accelerated protons and antiprotons in a 6.28 km (3.90 mi) circumference ring to energies of up to 1 TeV, hence its name. The Tevatron was completed in 1983 at a cost of $120 million and significant upgrade investments were made during its active years of 1983–2011.

The main achievement of the Tevatron was the discovery in 1995 of the top quark—the last fundamental fermion predicted by the Standard Model of particle physics. On July 2, 2012, scientists of the CDF and DØ collider experiment teams at Fermilab announced the findings from the analysis of around 500 trillion collisions produced from the Tevatron collider since 2001, and found that the existence of the suspected Higgs boson was highly likely with a confidence of 99.8%, later improved to over 99.9%.

The Tevatron ceased operations on 30 September 2011, due to budget cuts and because of the completion of the LHC, which began operations in early 2010 and is far more powerful (planned energies were two 7 TeV beams at the LHC compared to 1 TeV at the Tevatron). The main ring of the Tevatron will probably be reused in future experiments, and its components may be transferred to other particle accelerators.

== History ==
December 1, 1968, saw the breaking of ground for the linear accelerator (linac). The construction of the Main Accelerator Enclosure began on October 3, 1969, when the first shovel of earth was turned by Robert R. Wilson, NAL's director. This would become the 6.3 km circumference Fermilab's Main Ring.

The linac first 200 MeV beam started on December 1, 1970. The booster first 8 GeV beam was produced on May 20, 1971. On June 30, 1971, a proton beam was guided for the first time through the entire National Accelerator Laboratory accelerator system including the Main Ring. The beam was accelerated to only 7 GeV. Back then, the Booster Accelerator took 200 MeV protons from the Linac and "boosted" their energy to 8 billion electron volts. They were then injected into the Main Accelerator.

On the same year before the completion of the Main Ring, Wilson testified to the Joint Committee on Atomic Energy on March 9, 1971, that it was feasible to achieve a higher energy by using superconducting magnets. He also suggested that it could be done by using the same tunnel as the main ring and the new magnets would be installed in the same locations to be operated in parallel to the existing magnets of the Main Ring. That was the starting point of the Tevatron project. The Tevatron was in research and development phase between 1973 and 1979 while the acceleration at the Main Ring continued to be enhanced.

A series of milestones saw acceleration rise to 20 GeV on January 22, 1972, to 53 GeV on February 4 and to 100 GeV on February 11. On March 1, 1972, the then NAL accelerator system accelerated for the first time a beam of protons to its design energy of 200 GeV. By the end of 1973, NAL's accelerator system operated routinely at 300 GeV.

On 14 May 1976 Fermilab took its protons all the way to 500 GeV. This achievement provided the opportunity to introduce a new energy scale, the teraelectronvolt (TeV), equal to 1000 GeV. On 17 June of that year, the European Super Proton Synchrotron accelerator (SPS) had achieved an initial circulating proton beam (with no accelerating radio-frequency power) of only 400 GeV.

The conventional magnet Main Ring was shut down in 1981 for installation of superconducting magnets underneath it. The Main Ring continued to serve as an injector for the Tevatron until the Main Injector was completed west of the Main Ring in 2000. The 'Energy Doubler', as it was known then, produced its first accelerated beam—512 GeV—on July 3, 1983.

Its initial energy of 800 GeV was achieved on February 16, 1984. On October 21, 1986, acceleration at the Tevatron was pushed to 900 GeV, providing a first proton–antiproton collision at 1.8 TeV on November 30, 1986.

The Main Injector, which replaced the Main Ring, was the most substantial addition, built over six years from 1993 at a cost of $290 million. Tevatron collider Run II begun on March 1, 2001, after successful completion of that facility upgrade. From then, the beam had been capable of delivering an energy of 980 GeV.

On July 16, 2004, the Tevatron achieved a new peak luminosity, breaking the record previously held by the old European Intersecting Storage Rings (ISR) at CERN. That very Fermilab record was doubled on September 9, 2006, then a bit more than tripled on March 17, 2008, and ultimately multiplied by a factor of 4 over the previous 2004 record on April 16, 2010 (up to 4×10^{32} cm^{−2} s^{−1}).

The Tevatron ceased operations on 30 September 2011. By the end of 2011, the Large Hadron Collider (LHC) at CERN had achieved a luminosity almost ten times higher than Tevatron's (at 3.65×10^{33} cm^{−2} s^{−1}) and a beam energy of 3.5 TeV each (doing so since March 18, 2010), already ~3.6 times the capabilities of the Tevatron (at 0.98 TeV).

== Mechanics ==
The acceleration occurred in a number of stages. The first stage was the 750 keV Cockcroft–Walton pre-accelerator, which ionized hydrogen gas and accelerated the negative ions created using a positive voltage. The ions then passed into the 150 meter long linear accelerator (linac) which used oscillating electrical fields to accelerate the ions to 400 MeV. The ions then passed through a carbon foil, to remove the electrons, and the charged protons then moved into the Booster.

The Booster was a small circular synchrotron, around which the protons passed up to 20,000 times to attain an energy of around 8 GeV. From the Booster the particles were fed into the Main Injector, which had been completed in 1999 to perform a number of tasks. It could accelerate protons up to 150 GeV; produce 120 GeV protons for antiproton creation; increase antiproton energy to 150 GeV; and inject protons or antiprotons into the Tevatron. The antiprotons were created by the Antiproton Source. 120 GeV protons were collided with a nickel target producing a range of particles including antiprotons which could be collected and stored in the accumulator ring. The ring could then pass the antiprotons to the Main Injector.

The Tevatron could accelerate the particles from the Main Injector up to 980 GeV. The protons and antiprotons were accelerated in opposite directions, crossing paths in the CDF and DØ detectors to collide at 1.96 TeV. To hold the particles on track the Tevatron used 774 niobium–titanium superconducting dipole magnets cooled in liquid helium producing the field strength of 4.2 tesla. The field ramped over about 20 seconds as the particles accelerated. Another 240 NbTi quadrupole magnets were used to focus the beam.

The initial design luminosity of the Tevatron was 10^{30} cm^{−2} s^{−1}, however, following upgrades, the accelerator had been able to deliver luminosities up to 4×10^{32} cm^{−2} s^{−1}.

On September 27, 1993, the cryogenic cooling system of the Tevatron Accelerator was named an International Historic Landmark by the American Society of Mechanical Engineers. The system, which provided cryogenic liquid helium to the Tevatron's superconducting magnets, was the largest low-temperature system in existence upon its completion in 1978. It kept the coils of the magnets, which bent and focused the particle beam, in a superconducting state, so that they consumed only ⅓ of the power they would have required at normal temperatures.

== Discoveries ==
The Tevatron confirmed the existence of several subatomic particles that were predicted by theoretical particle physics, or gave suggestions to their existence. In 1995, the CDF experiment and DØ experiment collaborations announced the discovery of the top quark, and by 2007 they measured its mass (172 GeV) to a precision of nearly 1%. In 2006, the CDF collaboration reported the first measurement of B_{s} oscillations, and observation of two types of sigma baryons. In 2007, the DØ and CDF collaborations reported direct observation of the "Cascade B" (Ξ^{−}_{b}) Xi baryon.

In September 2008, the DØ collaboration reported detection of the Ω^{−}_{b}, a "double strange" Omega baryon with the measured mass significantly higher than the quark model prediction. In May 2009 the CDF collaboration made public their results on search for Ω^{−}_{b} based on analysis of data sample roughly four times larger than the one used by DØ experiment. The mass measurements from the CDF experiment were 6054.4±6.8 MeV/c^{2} and in excellent agreement with Standard Model predictions, and no signal has been observed at the previously reported value from the DØ experiment. The two inconsistent results from DØ and CDF differ by 111±18 MeV/c^{2} or by 6.2 standard deviations. Due to excellent agreement between the mass measured by CDF and the theoretical expectation, it is a strong indication that the particle discovered by CDF is indeed the Ω^{−}_{b}. It is anticipated that new data from LHC experiments will clarify the situation in the near future.

On July 2, 2012, two days before a scheduled announcement at the Large Hadron Collider (LHC), scientists at the Tevatron collider from the CDF and DØ collaborations announced their findings from the analysis of around 500 trillion collisions produced since 2001: They found that the existence of the Higgs boson was likely with a mass in the region of 115 to 135 GeV. The statistical significance of the observed signs was 2.9 sigma, which meant that there is only a 1-in-550 chance that a signal of that magnitude would have occurred if no particle in fact existed with those properties. The final analysis of data from the Tevatron did however not settle the question of whether the Higgs particle exists. Only when the scientists from the Large Hadron Collider announced the more precise LHC results on July 4, 2012, with a mass of 125.3 ± 0.4 GeV (CMS) or 126 ± 0.4 GeV (ATLAS) respectively, was there strong evidence through consistent measurements by the LHC and the Tevatron for the existence of a Higgs particle at that mass range.

== Disruptions due to earthquakes ==
Even from thousands of miles away, earthquakes caused strong enough movements in the magnets to negatively affect the quality of particle beams and even disrupt them. Therefore, tiltmeters were installed on Tevatron's magnets to monitor minute movements and to help identify the cause of problems quickly. The first known earthquake to disrupt the beam was the 2002 Denali earthquake, with another collider shutdown caused by a moderate local quake on June 28, 2004. Since then, the minute seismic vibrations emanating from over 20 earthquakes were detected at the Tevatron without a shutdown including the 2004 Indian Ocean earthquake, the 2005 Nias–Simeulue earthquake, New Zealand's 2007 Gisborne earthquake, the 2010 Haiti earthquake and the 2010 Chile earthquake.

== See also ==
- Bevatron
- Large Hadron Collider
- Superconducting Super Collider
- Ultra-high-energy cosmic ray
- Relativistic Heavy Ion Collider
