= Sigma baryon =

Baryon made of specific quark combinations

- Composition: Σ^{+}: uus; Σ^{0}: uds; Σ^{−}: dds
- Statistics: Fermionic
- Family: Baryons
- Interactions: Strong, weak, electromagnetic, and gravity
- Types: 3
- Mass: Σ^{+}: 1189.37±0.07 MeV/c^{2}; Σ^{0}: 1192.642±0.024 MeV/c^{2}; Σ^{−}: 1197.449±0.030 MeV/c^{2}
- Spin: 1/2
- Strangeness: -1
- Isospin: 1

The sigma baryons are a family of subatomic hadron particles which have two quarks from the first flavour generation (up and / or down quarks), and a third quark from a higher flavour generation, in a combination where the wavefunction sign remains constant when any two quark flavours are swapped. They are thus baryons, with total isospin of 1, and can either be neutral or have an elementary charge of +2, +1, 0, or −1. They are closely related to the lambda baryons, which differ only in the wavefunction's behaviour upon flavour exchange.

The third quark can hence be either a strange (symbols Σ^{+}, Σ^{0}, Σ^{−}), a charm (symbols Σ^{++}_{c}, Σ^{+}_{c}, Σ^{0}_{c}), a bottom (symbols Σ^{+}_{b}, Σ^{0}_{b}, Σ^{−}_{b}) or a top (symbols Σ^{++}_{t}, Σ^{+}_{t}, Σ^{0}_{t}) quark. However, the top sigmas are expected to never be observed, since the Standard Model predicts the mean lifetime of top quarks to be roughly 5×10^{−25} s. This is about 20 times shorter than the timescale for strong interactions, and therefore it does not form hadrons.

== List ==
The symbols encountered in these lists are: I (isospin), J (total angular momentum), P (parity), u (up quark), d (down quark), s (strange quark), c (charm quark), t (top quark), b (bottom quark), Q (electric charge), S (strangeness), C (charmness), B′ (bottomness), T (topness), as well as other subatomic particles (hover for name).

Antiparticles are not listed in the table; however, they simply would have all quarks changed to antiquarks (and vice versa), and Q, B, S, C, B′, T, would be of opposite signs. I, J, and P values in red have not been firmly established by experiments, but are predicted by the quark model and are consistent with the measurements.

=== J^{P} = 1/2^{+} sigma baryons ===
J^{P} = 1/2^{+} sigma baryons
| Particle name | Symbol | Quark content | Rest mass (MeV/c^{2}) | I | J^{P} | Q (e) | S | C | B′ | T | Mean lifetime (s) | Decay modes (branching ratio) |
|---|---|---|---|---|---|---|---|---|---|---|---|---|
| Sigma | Σ^{+} | uus | 1,189.37 ± 0.07 | 1 | 1/2^{+} | +1 | −1 | 0 | 0 | 0 | 8.018 ± 0.026 × 10^{−11} | p^{+} + π^{0} ((51.57±0.30)%) n^{0} + π^{+}((48.31±0.30)%) |
| Sigma | Σ^{0} | uds | 1,192.642 ± 0.024 | 1 | 1/2^{+} | 0 | −1 | 0 | 0 | 0 | 7.4 ± 0.7 × 10^{−20} | Λ^{0} + γ (100%) |
| Sigma | Σ^{−} | dds | 1,197.449 ± 0.030 | 1 | 1/2^{+} | −1 | −1 | 0 | 0 | 0 | 1.479 ± 0.011 × 10^{−10} | n^{0} + π^{−} ((99.848±0.005)%) |
| Charmed sigma | Σ^{++}_{c}(2455) | uuc | 2,453.97 ± 0.14 | 1 | 1/2^{+} | +2 | 0 | +1 | 0 | 0 | 3.5 ± 0.4 × 10^{−22}^{^{[a]}} | Λ^{+}_{c} + π^{+}(≈100%) |
| Charmed sigma | Σ^{+}_{c}(2455) | udc | 2,452.9 ± 0.4 | 1 | 1/2^{+} | +1 | 0 | +1 | 0 | 0 | >1.4 × 10^{−22}^{^{[a]}} | Λ^{+}_{c} + π^{0} (≈100%) |
| Charmed sigma | Σ^{0}_{c}(2455) | ddc | 2,453.75 ± 0.14 | 1 | 1/2^{+} | 0 | 0 | +1 | 0 | 0 | 3.6± 0.4 × 10^{−22}^{^{[a]}} | Λ^{+}_{c} + π^{−} (≈100%) |
| Bottom sigma | Σ^{+}_{b} | uub | 5,810.56 ± 0.23 | 1 | 1/2^{+} | +1 | 0 | 0 | −1 | 0 | 1.31± 0.13 × 10^{−22}^{^{[a]}} | Λ^{0}_{b} + π^{+} (dominant) |
| Bottom sigma^{^{†}} | Σ^{0}_{b} | udb | Unknown | 1 | 1/2^{+} | 0 | 0 | 0 | −1 | 0 | Unknown | Unknown |
| Bottom sigma | Σ^{−}_{b} | ddb | 5,815.2 ± 0.27 | 1 | 1/2^{+} | −1 | 0 | 0 | −1 | 0 | 1.24± 0.13 × 10^{−22}^{^{[a]}} | Λ^{0}_{b} + π^{−} (dominant) |
| Top sigma^{^{‡}} | Σ^{++}_{t} | uut | — | 1 | 1/2^{+} | +2 | 0 | 0 | 0 | +1 | — | — |
| Top Sigma^{^{‡}} | Σ^{+}_{t} | udt | — | 1 | 1/2^{+} | +1 | 0 | 0 | 0 | +1 | — | — |
| Top Sigma^{^{‡}} | Σ^{0}_{t} | ddt | — | 1 | 1/2^{+} | 0 | 0 | 0 | 0 | +1 | — | — |

^{†} Particle currently unobserved, but predicted by the standard model.
^{‡} The standard model predicts that this particle cannot exist due to the short lifetime of the top quark.
^{[a]} PDG reports the resonance width (Γ). Here the conversion τ = ħ/Γ is given instead.
^{[b]} The specific values of the name has not been decided yet, but will likely be close to Σ_{b}(5810).

=== J^{P} = 3/2^{+} sigma baryons ===
J^{P} = 3/2^{+} sigma baryons
| Particle name | Symbol | Quark content | Rest mass (MeV/c^{2}) | I | J^{P} | Q (e) | S | C | B′ | T | Mean lifetime (s) | Commonly decays to |
|---|---|---|---|---|---|---|---|---|---|---|---|---|
| Sigma | Σ^{∗+}(1385) | uus | 1,382.8 ± 0.4 | 1 | 3/2^{+} | +1 | −1 | 0 | 0 | 0 | 1.84 ± 0.04 × 10^{−23}^{^{[c]}} | Λ^{0} + π^{+} or Σ^{+} + π^{0} or Σ^{0} + π^{+} |
| Sigma | Σ^{∗0}(1385) | uds | 1,383.7 ± 1.0 | 1 | 3/2^{+} | 0 | −1 | 0 | 0 | 0 | 1.8 ± 0.3 × 10^{−23}^{^{[c]}} | Λ^{0} + π^{0} or Σ^{+} + π^{−} or Σ^{−} + π^{+} |
| Sigma | Σ^{∗−}(1385) | dds | 1,387.2 ± 0.5 | 1 | 3/2^{+} | −1 | −1 | 0 | 0 | 0 | 1.67 ± 0.09 × 10^{−23}^{^{[c]}} | Λ^{0} + π^{−} or Σ^{0} + π^{−} or Σ^{−} + π^{0} or |
| Charmed sigma | Σ^{∗++}_{c}(2520) | uuc | 2,518.4 ± 0.6 | 1 | 3/2^{+} | +2 | 0 | +1 | 0 | 0 | 4.4 ± 0.6 × 10^{−23}^{^{[c]}} | Λ^{+}_{c} + π^{+} |
| Charmed sigma | Σ^{∗+}_{c}(2520) | udc | 2,517.5 ± 2.3 | 1 | 3/2^{+} | +1 | 0 | +1 | 0 | 0 | >3.9 × 10^{−23}^{^{[c]}} | Λ^{+}_{c} + π^{0} |
| Charmed sigma | Σ^{∗0}_{c}(2520) | ddc | 2,518.0 ± 0.5 | 1 | 3/2^{+} | 0 | 0 | +1 | 0 | 0 | 4.1 ± 0.5 × 10^{−23}^{^{[c]}} | Λ^{+}_{c} + π^{−} |
| Bottom sigma^{^{†}} | Σ^{∗+}_{b} | uub | Unknown | 1 | 3/2^{+} | +1 | 0 | 0 | −1 | 0 | Unknown | Unknown |
| Bottom sigma^{^{†}} | Σ^{∗0}_{b} | udb | Unknown | 1 | 3/2^{+} | 0 | 0 | 0 | −1 | 0 | Unknown | Unknown |
| Bottom sigma^{^{†}} | Σ^{∗−}_{b} | ddb | Unknown | 1 | 3/2^{+} | −1 | 0 | 0 | −1 | 0 | Unknown | Unknown |
| Top sigma^{^{‡}} | Σ^{∗++}_{t} | uut | — | 1 | 3/2^{+} | +2 | 0 | 0 | 0 | +1 | — | — |
| Top sigma^{^{‡}} | Σ^{∗+}_{t} | udt | — | 1 | 3/2^{+} | +1 | 0 | 0 | 0 | +1 | — | — |
| Top sigma^{^{‡}} | Σ^{∗0}_{t} | ddt | — | 1 | 3/2^{+} | 0 | 0 | 0 | 0 | +1 | — | — |

^{†} Particle currently unobserved, but predicted by the standard model.
^{‡} The standard model predicts that this particle cannot exist due to the short lifetime of the top quark.
^{[c]} PDG reports the resonance width (Γ). Here the conversion τ = ħ/Γ is given instead.

== See also ==
- Delta baryon
- Hyperon
- Lambda baryon
- List of mesons
- List of particles
- Nucleon
- Omega baryon
- Physics portal
- Timeline of particle discoveries
- Xi baryon

== Bibliography ==
- Amsler, C.; et al. (Particle Data Group) (2008). "Review of Particle Physics" (PDF). Physics Letters B. 667 (1): 1. Bibcode:2008PhLB..667....1A. doi:10.1016/j.physletb.2008.07.018. hdl:1854/LU-685594. S2CID 227119789.
- Körner, J.G.; Krämer, M. & Pirjol, D. (1994). "Heavy Baryons". Progress in Particle and Nuclear Physics. 33: 787–868. arXiv:hep-ph/9406359. Bibcode:1994PrPNP..33..787K. doi:10.1016/0146-6410(94)90053-1. S2CID 118931787.
- Aaltonen, T.; et al. (CDF Collaboration) (2007). "First Observation of Heavy Baryons Σ_{b} and Σ^{∗}_{b}" (PDF). Physical Review Letters. 99 (20) 202001. arXiv:0706.3868. Bibcode:2007PhRvL..99t2001A. doi:10.1103/PhysRevLett.99.202001. PMID 18233134. S2CID 11241393.
