= Timeline of particle discoveries =

This is a timeline of subatomic particle discoveries, including all particles thus far discovered which appear to be elementary (that is, indivisible) given the best available evidence. It also includes the discovery of composite particles and antiparticles that were of particular historical importance.

More specifically, the inclusion criteria are:

- Elementary particles from the Standard Model of particle physics that have so far been observed. The Standard Model is the most comprehensive existing model of particle behavior. All Standard Model particles including the Higgs boson have been verified, and all other observed particles are combinations of two or more Standard Model particles.
- Antiparticles which were historically important to the development of particle physics, specifically the positron and antiproton. The discovery of these particles required very different experimental methods from that of their ordinary matter counterparts, and provided evidence that all particles had antiparticles—an idea that is fundamental to quantum field theory, the modern mathematical framework for particle physics. In the case of most subsequent particle discoveries, the particle and its anti-particle were discovered essentially simultaneously.
- Composite particles which were the first particle discovered containing a particular elementary constituent, or whose discovery was critical to the understanding of particle physics.

Time	Event
1800	William Herschel discovers "heat rays" (now known as infrared)
1801	Johann Wilhelm Ritter made the hallmark observation that invisible rays just beyond the violet end of the visible spectrum were especially effective at lightening silver chloride-soaked paper. He called them "de-oxidizing rays" to emphasize chemical reactivity and to distinguish them from "heat rays" at the other end of the invisible spectrum (both of which were later determined to be photons). The more general term "chemical rays" was adopted shortly thereafter to describe the oxidizing rays, and it remained popular throughout the 19th century. The terms chemical and heat rays were eventually dropped in favor of ultraviolet and infrared radiation, respectively.
1895	Discovery of the ultraviolet radiation below 200 nm, named vacuum ultraviolet (later identified as photons) because it is strongly absorbed by air, by the German physicist Victor Schumann
1895	X-ray produced by Wilhelm Röntgen (later identified as photons)
1897	Electron discovered by J. J. Thomson
1899	Alpha particle discovered by Ernest Rutherford in uranium radiation
1900	Gamma ray (a high-energy photon) discovered by Paul Villard in uranium decay
1911	Atomic nucleus identified by Ernest Rutherford, based on scattering observed by Hans Geiger and Ernest Marsden
1919	Proton discovered by Ernest Rutherford
1931	Deuteron discovered by Harold Urey (predicted by Rutherford in 1920)
1932	Neutron discovered by James Chadwick (predicted by Rutherford in 1920) Main article: Discovery of the neutron
1932	Antielectron (or positron), the first antiparticle, discovered by Carl D. Anderson (proposed by Paul Dirac in 1927 and by Ettore Majorana in 1928)
1937	Muon (or mu lepton) discovered by Seth Neddermeyer, Carl D. Anderson, J.C. Street, and E.C. Stevenson, using cloud chamber measurements of cosmic rays (it was mistaken for the pion until 1947)
1947	Pion (or pi meson) discovered by C. F. Powell's group, including César Lattes (first author) and Giuseppe Occhialini (predicted by Hideki Yukawa in 1935)
1947	Kaon (or K meson), the first strange particle, discovered by George Dixon Rochester and Clifford Charles Butler
1950	Λ^{0} (or lambda baryon) discovered during a study of cosmic-ray interactions
1955	Antiproton discovered by Owen Chamberlain, Emilio Segrè, Clyde Wiegand, and Thomas Ypsilantis
1956	Electron neutrino detected by Frederick Reines and Clyde Cowan (proposed by Wolfgang Pauli in 1930 to explain the apparent violation of conservation of energy in beta decay) At the time it was simply referred to as neutrino since there was only one known neutrino. Main article: Cowan–Reines neutrino experiment
1962	Muon neutrino (or mu neutrino) shown to be distinct from the electron neutrino by a group headed by Leon Lederman
1964	Omega baryon and Xi baryon discovery at Brookhaven National Laboratory
1969	Partons (internal constituents of hadrons) observed in deep inelastic scattering experiments between protons and electrons at SLAC; this was eventually associated with the quark model (predicted by Murray Gell-Mann and George Zweig in 1964) and thus constitutes the discovery of the up quark, down quark, and strange quark.
1974	J/ψ meson discovered by groups headed by Burton Richter and Samuel Ting, demonstrating the existence of the charm quark (proposed by James Bjorken and Sheldon Glashow in 1964)
1975	Tau discovered by a group headed by Martin Perl
1977	Upsilon meson discovered at Fermilab, demonstrating the existence of the bottom quark (proposed by Kobayashi and Maskawa in 1973)
1979	Gluon observed indirectly in three-jet events at DESY
1983	W and Z bosons discovered by Carlo Rubbia, Simon van der Meer, and the CERN UA1 collaboration (predicted in detail by Sheldon Glashow, Mohammad Abdus Salam, and Steven Weinberg)
1995	Top quark discovered at Fermilab
1995	Antihydrogen produced and measured by the LEAR experiment at CERN
2000	Quark-gluon fireball discovered at CERN
2000	Tau neutrino first observed directly at Fermilab
2011	Antihelium-4 produced and measured by the STAR detector; the first particle to be discovered by the experiment
2012	Higgs boson discovered by the CMS and ATLAS experiments at CERN's Large Hadron Collider

== See also ==
- List of baryons
- List of mesons
- List of particles
