= Lambda baryon =

Baryon made of specific quark combinations

- Quark structure of the lambda baryon.
- Composition: Λ^{0}: uds; Λ^{+}_{c}: udc; Λ^{0}_{b}: udb
- Statistics: Fermionic
- Family: Baryons
- Interactions: Strong, weak, electromagnetic, and gravity
- Types: 3
- Mass: Λ^{0}: 1115.683±0.006 MeV/c^{2}; Λ^{+}_{c}: 2286.46±0.14 MeV/c^{2}; Λ^{0}_{b}: 5619.60±0.17 MeV/c^{2}
- Spin: 1/2 ħ
- Isospin: 0

The lambda baryons (Λ) are a family of subatomic hadron particles containing one up quark, one down quark, and a third quark from a higher flavour generation, in a combination where the quantum wave function changes sign upon the flavour of any two quarks being swapped (thus slightly different from a neutral sigma baryon, Σ^{0}). They are thus baryons, with total isospin of 0, and have either neutral electric charge or the elementary charge +1.

== Overview ==
The lambda baryon Λ^{0} was first discovered in October 1950, by V. D. Hopper and S. Biswas of the University of Melbourne, as a neutral V particle with a proton as a decay product, thus correctly distinguishing it as a baryon, rather than a meson, i.e. different in kind from the K meson discovered in 1947 by George Rochester and Clifford Charles Butler; they were produced by cosmic rays and detected in photographic emulsions flown in a balloon at 70,000 feet (21,000 m). Though the particle was expected to live for ~10^{−23} s, it actually survived for ~10^{−10} s. The property that caused it to live so long was dubbed strangeness and led to the discovery of the strange quark. Furthermore, these discoveries led to a principle known as the conservation of strangeness, wherein lightweight particles do not decay as quickly if they exhibit strangeness (because non-weak methods of particle decay must preserve the strangeness of the decaying baryon). The Λ^{0} with its uds quark decays via weak force to a nucleon and a pion − either Λ → p + π^{−} or Λ → n + π^{0}.

In 1974 and 1975, an international team at the Fermilab that included scientists from Fermilab and seven European laboratories under the leadership of Eric Burhop carried out a search for a new particle, the existence of which Burhop had predicted in 1963. He had suggested that neutrino interactions could create short-lived (perhaps as low as 10^{−14} s) particles that could be detected with the use of nuclear emulsion. Experiment E247 at Fermilab successfully detected particles with a lifetime of the order of 10^{−13} s. A follow-up experiment, WA17, which made use of the SPS accelerator at CERN confirmed the existence of the Λ^{+}_{c} (charmed lambda baryon), with a lifetime of (7.3±0.1)×10^{−13} s.

In 2011, the international team at JLab used high-resolution spectrometer measurements of the reaction H(e, e′K^{+})X at small Q^{2} (E-05-009) to extract the pole position in the complex-energy plane (primary signature of a resonance) for the Λ(1520) with mass 1518.8 MeV/c^{2} and width 17.2 MeV/c^{2}, which seem to be smaller than their Breit–Wigner values. This was the first determination of the pole position for a hyperon.

The lambda baryon has also been observed in atomic nuclei called hypernuclei. These nuclei contain the same number of protons and neutrons as a known nucleus, but also contains one or in rare cases two lambda particles. In such a scenario, the lambda slides into the center of the nucleus (it is not a proton or a neutron, and thus is not affected by the Pauli exclusion principle), and it binds the nucleus more tightly together due to its interaction via the strong force. In a lithium isotope (^{7}_{Λ}Li), it made the nucleus 19% smaller.

== Types ==
Lambda baryons are usually represented by the symbols Λ^{0}, Λ^{+}_{c}, Λ^{0}_{b}, and Λ^{+}_{t}. In this notation, the superscript character indicates whether the particle is electrically neutral (^{0}) or carries a positive charge (^{+}). The subscript character, or its absence, indicates whether the third quark is a strange quark (Λ^{0}) (no subscript), a charm quark (Λ^{+}_{c}), a bottom quark (Λ^{0}_{b}), or a top quark (Λ^{+}_{t}). Physicists expect to not observe a lambda baryon with a top quark, because the Standard Model of particle physics predicts that the mean lifetime of top quarks is roughly 5×10^{−25} seconds; that is about 1/20 of the mean timescale for strong interactions, which indicates that the top quark would decay before a lambda baryon could form a hadron.

The symbols encountered in this list are: I (isospin), J (total angular momentum quantum number), P (parity), Q (charge), S (strangeness), C (charmness), B′ (bottomness), T (topness), u (up quark), d (down quark), s (strange quark), c (charm quark), b (bottom quark), t (top quark), as well as other subatomic particles.

Antiparticles are not listed in the table; however, they simply would have all quarks changed to antiquarks, and Q, B, S, C, B′, T, would be of opposite signs. I, J, and P values in red have not been firmly established by experiments, but are predicted by the quark model and are consistent with the measurements. The top lambda (Λ^{+}_{t}) is listed for comparison, but is expected to never be observed, because top quarks decay before they have time to form hadrons.

Lambda baryons
| Particle name | Symbol | Quark content | Rest mass [MeV/c^{2}] | I | J^{P} | Q [e] | S | C | B′ | T | Mean lifetime [s] | Commonly decays to |
|---|---|---|---|---|---|---|---|---|---|---|---|---|
| Lambda | Λ^{0} | uds | 1115.683±0.006 | 0 | 1/2^{+} | 0 | −1 | 0 | 0 | 0 | (2.631±0.020)×10^{−10} | p^{+} + π^{−} or n^{0} + π^{0} |
| charmed lambda | Λ^{+}_{c} | udc | 2286.46±0.14 | 0 | 1/2^{+} | +1 | 0 | +1 | 0 | 0 | (2.00±0.06)×10^{−13} | decay modes |
| bottom lambda | Λ^{0}_{b} | udb | 5620.2±1.6 | 0 | 1/2^{+} | 0 | 0 | 0 | −1 | 0 | 1.409+0.055 −0.054×10^{−12} | Decay modes |
| top lambda^{^{‡}} | Λ^{+}_{t} | udt | — | 0 | 1/2^{+} | +1 | 0 | 0 | 0 | +1 | — | ^{‡} |

‡ Particle unobserved, because the top-quark decays before it has sufficient time to bind into a hadron ("hadronizes").

== See also ==
- List of baryons
