= Particle zoo =

Colloquial term for the list of known subatomic particles

In particle physics, the term particle zoo is used colloquially to describe the relatively extensive list of known subatomic particles by analogy to the variety of species in a zoo.

In the history of particle physics, the topic of particles was considered to be particularly confusing in the late 1960s. Before the discovery of quarks, hundreds of strongly interacting particles (hadrons) were known and believed to be distinct elementary particles. It was later discovered that they were not elementary particles, but rather composites of quarks. The set of particles believed today to be elementary is known as the Standard Model and includes quarks, bosons and leptons.

The term "subnuclear zoo" was coined or popularized by Robert Oppenheimer in 1956 at the VI Rochester International Conference on High Energy Physics.

== See also ==
- Eightfold way (physics)
- List of baryons
- List of mesons
- List of particles
