= Eightfold way (physics) =

Classification scheme for hadrons

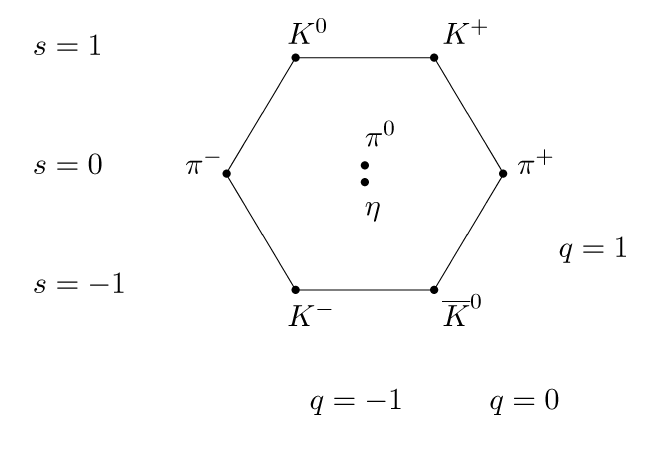
The pseudoscalar meson octet. Particles along the same horizontal line share the same strangeness, s, while those on the same left-leaning diagonals share the same charge, q (given as multiples of the elementary charge).

In physics, the eightfold way is an organizational scheme for a class of subatomic particles known as hadrons that led to the development of the quark model. The American physicist Murray Gell-Mann and the Israeli physicist Yuval Ne'eman independently and simultaneously proposed the idea in 1961. (Note: In Gell-Mann's 1961 paper, Reference 6 says After the circulation of the preliminary version of this work (January 1961) the author has learned of a similar theory put forward independently and simultaneously by Y. Ne'eman (Nuclear Physics, to be published). Earlier uses of the 3 dimensional unitary group in connection with the Sakata model are reported by Y. Ohnuki at the 1960 Rochester Conference on High Energy Physics. A. Salam and J. Ward (Nuovo Cimento, to be published) have considered related questions. The author would like to thank Dr. Ne'eman and Professor Salam for communicating their results to him. while the very end of Ne'eman's (1961) paper reads, I am indebted to Prof. A. Salam for discussions on this problem. In fact, when I presented this paper to him, he showed me a study he had done on the unitary theory of the Sakata model, treated as a gauge, and thus producing a similar set of vector bosons. Shortly after the present paper was written, a further version, utilizing the 8 representation for baryons, as in this paper, reached us in a preprint by Prof. M. Gell Mann.) The name comes from Gell-Mann's (1961) paper, "The Eightfold Way: A theory of strong interaction symmetry." It is an allusion to the Noble Eightfold Path of Buddhism and was meant to be a joke.

== Background ==
By 1947, physicists believed that they had a good understanding of what the smallest bits of matter were. There were electrons, protons, neutrons, and photons (the components that make up the vast part of everyday experience such as visible matter and light) along with a handful of unstable (i.e., they undergo radioactive decay) exotic particles needed to explain cosmic rays observations such as pions, muons and the hypothesized neutrinos. In addition, the discovery of the positron suggested there could be anti-particles for each of them. It was known a "strong interaction" must exist to overcome electrostatic repulsion in atomic nuclei. Not all particles are influenced by this strong force; but those that are, are dubbed "hadrons"; these are now further classified as mesons (from the Greek for "intermediate") and baryons (from the Greek for "heavy").

But the discovery of the neutral kaon in late 1947 and the subsequent discovery of a positively charged kaon in 1949 extended the meson family in an unexpected way, and in 1950 the lambda particle did the same thing for the baryon family. These particles decay much more slowly than they are produced, a hint that there are two different physical processes involved. This was first suggested by Abraham Pais in 1952. In 1953, Murray Gell-Mann and a collaboration in Japan, Tadao Nakano with Kazuhiko Nishijima, independently suggested a new conserved value now known as "strangeness" during their attempts to understand the growing collection of known particles. (Note: A footnote in Nakano and Nishijima's paper says After the completion of this work, the authors knew in a private letter from Prof. Nambu to Prof. Hayakawa that Dr. Gell-Mann has also developed a similar theory.) The discovery of new mesons and baryons continued through the 1950s; the number of known "elementary" particles ballooned. Physicists were interested in understanding hadron-hadron interactions via the strong interaction. The concept of isospin, introduced in 1932 by Werner Heisenberg shortly after the discovery of the neutron, was used to group some hadrons together into "multiplets" but no successful scientific theory as yet covered the hadrons as a whole. This was the beginning of a chaotic period in particle physics that has become known as the "particle zoo" era. The eightfold way represented a step out of this confusion and towards the quark model, which proved to be the solution.

== Organization ==
Group representation theory is the mathematical underpinning of the eightfold way, but technical mathematics is not needed to understand how it helps organize particles. Particles are sorted into groups as mesons or baryons. Within each group, they are further separated by their spin angular momentum. Symmetrical patterns appear when these groups of particles have their strangeness plotted against their electric charge. (This is the most common way to make these plots today, but originally physicists used an equivalent pair of properties called hypercharge and isotopic spin, the latter of which is now known as isospin.) The symmetry in these patterns is a hint of the underlying symmetry of the strong interaction between the particles themselves. In the plots below, points representing particles that lie along the same horizontal line share the same strangeness, s, while those on the same left-leaning diagonals share the same electric charge, q (given as multiples of the elementary charge).

=== Mesons ===
In the original eightfold way, the mesons were organized into octets and singlets. This is one of the finer points of differences between the eightfold way and the quark model it inspired, which suggests the mesons should be grouped into nonets (groups of nine).

==== Meson octet ====
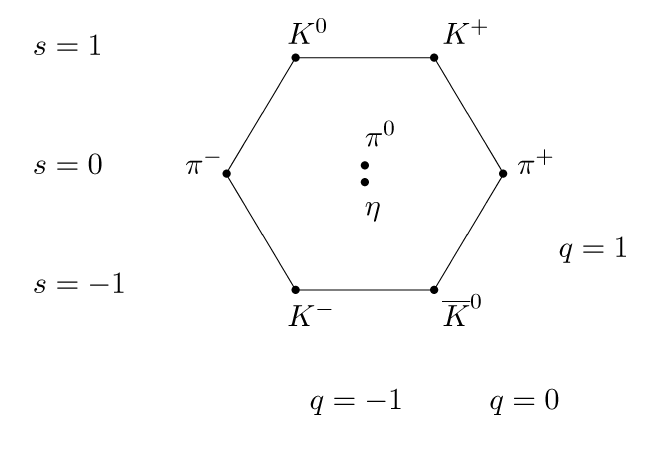
The pseudoscalar meson octet

The eightfold way organizes eight of the lowest spin-0 mesons into an octet. They are:

- K^{0}, K^{+}, K^{−} and K̅^{0} kaons
- π^{+}, π^{0}, and π^{−} pions
- η, the eta meson

Diametrically opposite particles in the diagram are anti-particles of one another, while particles in the center are their own anti-particle.

==== Meson singlet ====
The chargeless, strangeless eta prime meson was originally classified by itself as a singlet:

- η′

Under the quark model later developed, it is better viewed as part of a meson nonet, as previously mentioned.

=== Baryons ===
==== Baryon octet ====
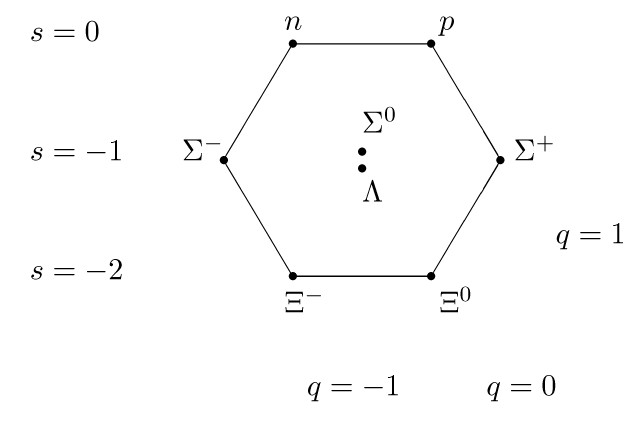
The J = 1/2 baryon octet

The eightfold way organizes the spin-1/ 2 baryons into an octet. They consist of

- neutron (n) and proton (p)
- Σ^{−}, Σ^{0}, and Σ^{+} sigma baryons
- Λ^{0}, the strange lambda baryon
- Ξ^{−} and Ξ^{0} xi baryons

==== Baryon decuplet ====
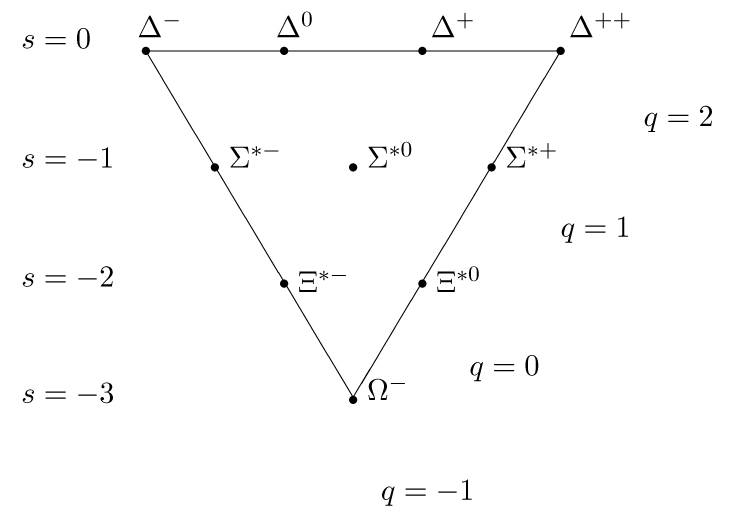
The J = 3/2 baryon decuplet

The organizational principles of the eightfold way also apply to the spin-3/2 baryons, forming a decuplet.

- Δ^{−}, Δ^{0}, Δ^{+}, and Δ^{++} delta baryons
- Σ^{∗−}, Σ^{∗0}, and Σ^{∗+} sigma baryons
- Ξ^{∗−} and Ξ^{∗0} xi baryons
- Ω^{−} omega baryon

However, one of the particles of this decuplet had never been previously observed when the eightfold way was proposed. Gell-Mann called this particle the Ω^{−} and predicted in 1962 that it would have a strangeness −3, electric charge −1 and a mass near 1680 MeV/c^{2}. In 1964, a particle closely matching these predictions was discovered by a particle accelerator group at Brookhaven. Gell-Mann received the 1969 Nobel Prize in Physics for his work on the theory of elementary particles.

== Historical development ==
=== Development ===
Historically, quarks were motivated by an understanding of flavour symmetry. First, it was noticed (1961) that groups of particles were related to each other in a way that matched the representation theory of SU(3). From that, it was inferred that there is an approximate symmetry of the universe which is represented by the group SU(3). Finally (1964), this led to the discovery of three light quarks (up, down, and strange) interchanged by these SU(3) transformations.

=== Modern interpretation ===
The eightfold way may be understood in modern terms as a consequence of flavor symmetries between various kinds of quarks. Since the strong nuclear force affects quarks the same way regardless of their flavor, replacing one flavor of quark with another in a hadron should not alter its mass very much, provided the respective quark masses are smaller than the strong interaction scale—which holds for the three light quarks. Mathematically, this replacement may be described by elements of the SU(3) group. The octets and other hadron arrangements are representations of this group.

== Flavor symmetry ==
=== SU(3) ===
There is an abstract three-dimensional vector space:
$$\text{up quark} \to \begin{pmatrix} 1 \\ 0 \\ 0 \end{pmatrix}, \qquad
\text{down quark} \to \begin{pmatrix} 0 \\ 1 \\ 0 \end{pmatrix}, \qquad
\text{strange quark} \to \begin{pmatrix} 0 \\ 0 \\ 1 \end{pmatrix},$$
and the laws of physics are approximately invariant under a determinant-1 unitary transformation to this space (sometimes called a flavour rotation):
$$\begin{pmatrix} x \\ y \\ z \end{pmatrix} \mapsto
A \begin{pmatrix} x \\ y \\ z \end{pmatrix}, \quad
\text{where}\ A\ \text{is in}\ SU(3).$$

Here, SU(3) refers to the Lie group of 3×3 unitary matrices with determinant 1 (special unitary group). For example, the flavour rotation
$$A = \begin{pmatrix}
\phantom- 0 & 1 & 0 \\
-1 & 0 & 0 \\
\phantom- 0 & 0 & 1
\end{pmatrix}$$
is a transformation that simultaneously turns all the up quarks in the universe into down quarks and conversely. More specifically, these flavour rotations are exact symmetries if only strong force interactions are looked at, but they are not truly exact symmetries of the universe because the three quarks have different masses and different electroweak interactions.

This approximate symmetry is called flavour symmetry, or more specifically flavour SU(3) symmetry.

=== Connection to representation theory ===
Assume we have a certain particle—for example, a proton—in a quantum state $|\psi\rangle$. If we apply one of the flavour rotations A to our particle, it enters a new quantum state which we can call $A|\psi\rangle$. Depending on A, this new state might be a proton, or a neutron, or a superposition of a proton and a neutron, or various other possibilities. The set of all possible quantum states spans a vector space.

Representation theory is a mathematical theory that describes the situation where elements of a group (here, the flavour rotations A in the group SU(3)) are automorphisms of a vector space (here, the set of all possible quantum states that you get from flavour-rotating a proton). Therefore, by studying the representation theory of SU(3), we can learn the possibilities for what the vector space is and how it is affected by flavour symmetry.

Since the flavour rotations A are approximate, not exact, symmetries, each orthogonal state in the vector space corresponds to a different particle species. In the example above, when a proton is transformed by every possible flavour rotation A, it turns out that it moves around an 8 dimensional vector space. Those 8 dimensions correspond to the 8 particles in the so-called "baryon octet" (proton, neutron, Σ^{+}, Σ^{0}, Σ^{−}, Ξ^{−}, Ξ^{0}, Λ). This corresponds to an 8-dimensional ("octet") representation of the group SU(3). Since A is an approximate symmetry, all the particles in this octet have similar mass.

Every Lie group has a corresponding Lie algebra, and each group representation of the Lie group can be mapped to a corresponding Lie algebra representation on the same vector space. The Lie algebra $\mathfrak{su}$(3) can be written as the set of 3×3 traceless Hermitian matrices. Physicists generally discuss the representation theory of the Lie algebra $\mathfrak{su}$(3) instead of the Lie group SU(3), since the former is simpler and the two are ultimately equivalent.
