= Strange quark =

Type of quark

strange quark
- Composition: elementary particle
- Statistics: fermionic
- Family: quark
- Generation: second
- Interactions: strong, weak, electromagnetic force, gravity
- Symbol: s
- Antiparticle: Strange antiquark (s̅)
- Theorized: Murray Gell-Mann (1964); George Zweig (1964)
- Discovered: 1947 Department of Physics and Astronomy, University of Manchester, 1968 SLAC
- Mass: 95+9 −3 MeV/c^{2}
- Decays into: up quark
- Electric charge: −1/3 e
- Color charge: Yes
- Spin: 1/2 ħ
- Weak isospin: LH: −1/2, RH: 0
- Weak hypercharge: LH: 1/3, RH: −2/3

The strange quark or s quark (from its symbol, s) is the third lightest of all quarks, a type of elementary particle. Strange quarks are found in subatomic particles called hadrons. Examples of hadrons containing strange quarks include kaons (K), strange D mesons (D_{s}), sigma baryons (Σ), and other strange particles.

According to the IUPAP, the symbol s is the official name, while "strange" is to be considered only as a mnemonic. The name sideways has also been used because the s quark (but also the other three remaining quarks) has an I_{3} value of 0 while the u ("up") and d ("down") quarks have values of 1/2 and -1/2 respectively.

Along with the charm quark, it is part of the second generation of matter. It has an electric charge of -1/3 e and a bare mass of 95+9
−3 MeV/c^{2}. Like all quarks, the strange quark is an elementary fermion with spin 1/2, and experiences all four fundamental interactions: gravitation, electromagnetism, weak interactions, and strong interactions. The antiparticle of the strange quark is the strange antiquark (sometimes called antistrange quark or simply antistrange), which differs from it only in that some of its properties have equal magnitude but opposite sign.

The first strange particle (a particle containing a strange quark) was discovered by George Rochester and Clifford Butler in Department of Physics and Astronomy, University of Manchester in 1947 (kaons), with the existence of the strange quark itself (and that of the up and down quarks) postulated in 1964 by Murray Gell-Mann and George Zweig to explain the eightfold way classification scheme of hadrons. The first evidence for the existence of quarks came in 1968, in deep inelastic scattering experiments at the Stanford Linear Accelerator Center. These experiments confirmed the existence of up and down quarks, and by extension, strange quarks, as they were required to explain the eightfold way.

== History ==
In the beginnings of particle physics (first half of the 20th century), hadrons such as protons, neutrons and pions were thought to be elementary particles. However, new hadrons were discovered and the "particle zoo" grew from a few particles in the early 1930s and 1940s to several dozens of them in the 1950s. Some particles were much longer lived than others; most particles decayed through the strong interaction and had lifetimes of around 10^{−23} seconds. When they decayed through the weak interactions, they had lifetimes of around 10^{−10} seconds. While studying these decays, Murray Gell-Mann (in 1953) and Kazuhiko Nishijima (in 1955) developed the concept of strangeness (which Nishijima called eta-charge, after the eta meson (η)) to explain the "strangeness" of the longer-lived particles. The Gell-Mann–Nishijima formula is the result of these efforts to understand strange decays.

Despite their work, the relationships between each particle and the physical basis behind the strangeness property remained unclear. In 1961, Gell-Mann and Yuval Ne'eman independently proposed a hadron classification scheme called the eightfold way, also known as SU(3) flavor symmetry. This ordered hadrons into isospin multiplets. The physical basis behind both isospin and strangeness was only explained in 1964, when Gell-Mann and George Zweig independently proposed the quark model, which at that time consisted only of the up, down, and strange quarks. Up and down quarks were the carriers of isospin, while the strange quark carried strangeness. While the quark model explained the eightfold way, no direct evidence of the existence of quarks was found until 1968 at the Stanford Linear Accelerator Center. Deep inelastic scattering experiments indicated that protons had substructure, and that protons made of three more-fundamental particles explained the data (thus confirming the quark model).

At first people were reluctant to identify the three-bodies as quarks, instead preferring Richard Feynman's parton description, but over time the quark theory became accepted (see November Revolution).

== See also ==
- Strangeness
- Quark model
- Strange matter
- Strangeness production
- Strangelet
- Strange star
