= Down quark =

Type of quark

- Composition: elementary particle
- Statistics: fermionic
- Family: quark
- Generation: first
- Interactions: strong, weak, electromagnetic, gravity
- Symbol: d
- Antiparticle: down antiquark (d̅)
- Theorized: Murray Gell-Mann (1964); George Zweig (1964)
- Discovered: SLAC (1968)
- Mass: 4.7+0.5 −0.3 MeV/c^{2}
- Decays into: stable or up quark + electron + electron antineutrino
- Electric charge: −1/3 e
- Color charge: Yes
- Spin: 1/2 ħ
- Weak isospin: LH: −1/2, RH: 0
- Weak hypercharge: LH: +1/3, RH: −2/3

The down quark (symbol: d) is a type of elementary particle, and a major constituent of matter. The down quark is the second-lightest of all quarks, and combines with other quarks to form composite particles called hadrons. Down quarks are most commonly found in atomic nuclei, where they combine with up quarks to form protons and neutrons. The proton is made of one down quark with two up quarks, and the neutron is made up of two down quarks with one up quark. Because they are found in every single known atom, down quarks are present in all everyday matter that we interact with.

The down quark is part of the first generation of matter, has an electric charge of −1/3 e and a bare mass of 4.7+0.5
−0.3 MeV/c^{2}. Like all quarks, the down quark is an elementary fermion with spin 1/2, and is subject to all four fundamental interactions: gravitation, electromagnetism, weak interactions, and strong interactions. The antiparticle of the down quark is the down antiquark (sometimes called antidown quark or simply antidown), which differs from it only in that some of its properties have equal magnitude but opposite sign.

Its existence (along with that of the up and strange quarks) was postulated in 1964 by Murray Gell-Mann and George Zweig to explain the Eightfold Way classification scheme of hadrons. The down quark was first observed by experiments at the Stanford Linear Accelerator Center in 1968.

== History ==
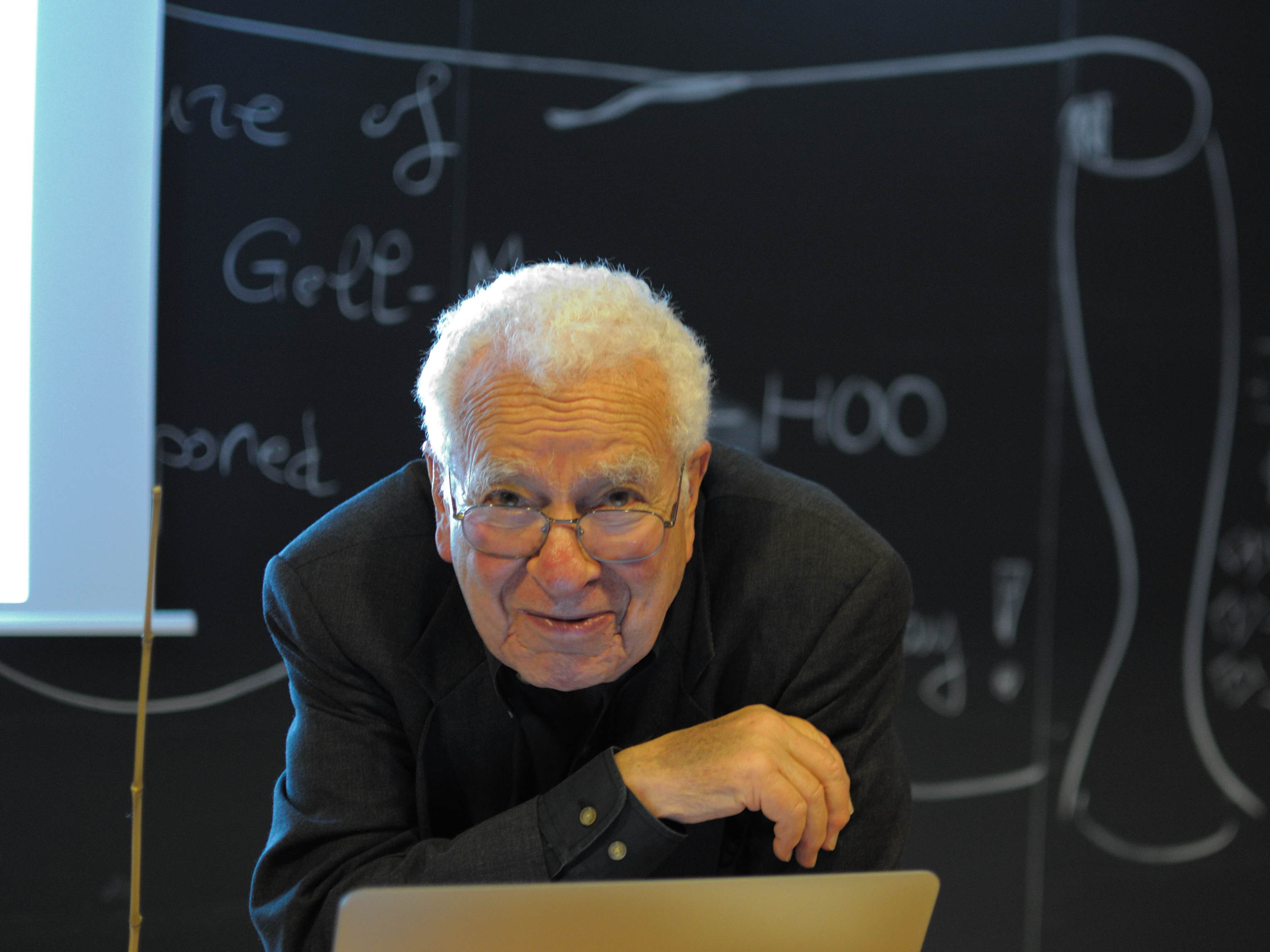
Murray Gell-Mann

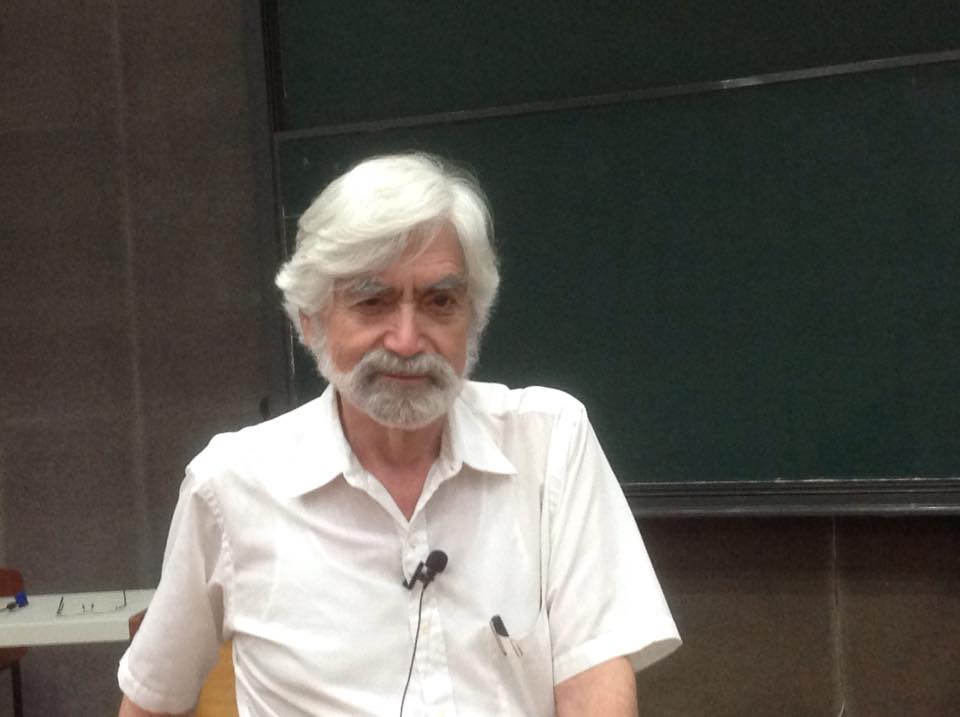
George Zweig

In the beginnings of particle physics (first half of the 20th century), hadrons such as protons, neutrons, and pions were thought to be elementary particles. However, as new hadrons were discovered, the 'particle zoo' grew from a few particles in the early 1930s and 1940s to several dozens of them in the 1950s. The relationships between them were unclear until 1961, when Murray Gell-Mann and Yuval Ne'eman (independently of each other) proposed a hadron classification scheme called the Eightfold Way, or in more technical terms, SU(3) flavor symmetry.

This classification scheme organized the hadrons into isospin multiplets, but the physical basis behind it was still unclear. In 1964, Gell-Mann and George Zweig (independently of each other) proposed the quark model, then consisting only of up, down, and strange quarks. However, while the quark model explained the Eightfold Way, no direct evidence of the existence of quarks was found until 1968 at the Stanford Linear Accelerator Center. Deep inelastic scattering experiments indicated that protons had substructure, and that protons made of three more-fundamental particles explained the data (thus confirming the quark model).

At first people were reluctant to identify the three bodies as quarks, instead preferring Richard Feynman's parton description, but over time the quark theory became accepted (see November Revolution).

== Mass ==
Despite being extremely common, the bare mass of the down quark is not well determined, but probably lies between 4.5 and 5.3 MeV/c^{2}. Lattice QCD calculations give a more precise value: 4.79±0.16 MeV/c^{2}.

When found in mesons (particles made of one quark and one antiquark) or baryons (particles made of three quarks), the 'effective mass' (or 'dressed' mass) of quarks becomes greater because of the binding energy caused by the gluon field between quarks (see mass–energy equivalence). For example, the effective mass of down quarks in a proton is around 300 MeV/c^{2}. Because the bare mass of down quarks is so small, it cannot be straightforwardly calculated because relativistic effects have to be taken into account.
