= Up quark =

Type of quark

- Composition: elementary particle
- Statistics: fermionic
- Family: quark
- Generation: first
- Interactions: strong, weak, electromagnetic, gravity
- Symbol: u
- Antiparticle: up antiquark (u̅)
- Theorized: Murray Gell-Mann (1964); George Zweig (1964)
- Discovered: SLAC (1968)
- Mass: 2.2+0.5 −0.4 MeV/c^{2}
- Decays into: stable or down quark + positron + electron neutrino
- Electric charge: +2/3 e
- Color charge: yes
- Spin: 1/2 ħ
- Weak isospin: LH: +1/2, RH: 0
- Weak hypercharge: LH: +1/3, RH: +4/3

The up quark or u quark (symbol: u) is the lightest of all quarks, a type of elementary particle, and a significant constituent of matter. It, along with the down quark, forms the neutrons (one up quark, two down quarks) and protons (two up quarks, one down quark) of atomic nuclei. It is part of the first generation of matter, has an electric charge of +2/3 e and a bare mass of 2.2+0.5
−0.4 MeV/c^{2}. Like all quarks, the up quark is an elementary fermion with spin 1/2, and experiences all four fundamental interactions: gravitation, electromagnetism, weak interactions, and strong interactions. The antiparticle of the up quark is the up antiquark (sometimes called antiup quark or simply antiup), which differs from it only in that some of its properties, such as charge have equal magnitude but opposite sign.

Its existence (along with that of the down and strange quarks) was postulated in 1964 by Murray Gell-Mann and George Zweig to explain the Eightfold Way classification scheme of hadrons. The up quark was first observed by experiments at the Stanford Linear Accelerator Center in 1968.

== History ==
In the beginnings of particle physics (first half of the 20th century), hadrons such as protons, neutrons and pions were thought to be elementary particles. However, as new hadrons were discovered, the 'particle zoo' grew from a few particles in the early 1930s and 1940s to several dozens of them in the 1950s. The relationships between each of them were unclear until 1961, when Murray Gell-Mann and Yuval Ne'eman (independently of each other) proposed a hadron classification scheme called the Eightfold Way, or in more technical terms, SU(3) flavor symmetry.

This classification scheme organized the hadrons into isospin multiplets, but the physical basis behind it was still unclear. In 1964, Gell-Mann and George Zweig (independently of each other) proposed the quark model, then consisting only of up, down, and strange quarks. However, while the quark model explained the Eightfold Way, no direct evidence of the existence of quarks was found until 1968 at the Stanford Linear Accelerator Center. Deep inelastic scattering experiments indicated that protons had substructure, and that protons made of three more-fundamental particles explained the data (thus confirming the quark model).

At first people were reluctant to describe the three bodies as quarks, instead preferring Richard Feynman's parton description, but over time the quark theory became accepted (see November Revolution).

== Mass ==
Despite being extremely common, the bare mass of the up quark is not well determined, but probably lies between 1.8 and 3.0 MeV/c^{2}. Lattice QCD calculations give a more precise value: 2.01±0.14 MeV/c^{2}.

When found in mesons (particles made of one quark and one antiquark) or baryons (particles made of three quarks), the 'effective mass' (or 'dressed' mass) of quarks becomes greater because of the binding energy caused by the gluon field between each quark (see Mass–energy equivalence). The bare mass of up quarks is so light, it cannot be straightforwardly calculated because relativistic effects have to be taken into account.

== See also ==
- Down quark
- Isospin
- Quark model
- Quantum Mechanics
