= Particle statistics =

Description of multiple particle in physics

Particle statistics is a particular description of multiple particles in statistical mechanics. A key prerequisite concept is that of a statistical ensemble (an idealization comprising the state space of possible states of a system, each labeled with a probability) that emphasizes properties of a large system as a whole at the expense of knowledge about parameters of separate particles. When an ensemble describes a system of particles with similar properties, their number is called the particle number and usually denoted by N.

== Classical statistics ==
In classical mechanics, all particles (fundamental and composite particles, atoms, molecules, electrons, etc.) in the system are considered distinguishable. This means that individual particles in a system can be tracked. As a consequence, switching the positions of any pair of particles in the system leads to a different configuration of the system. Furthermore, there is no restriction on placing more than one particle in any given state accessible to the system. These characteristics of classical positions are called Maxwell–Boltzmann statistics.

== Quantum statistics ==
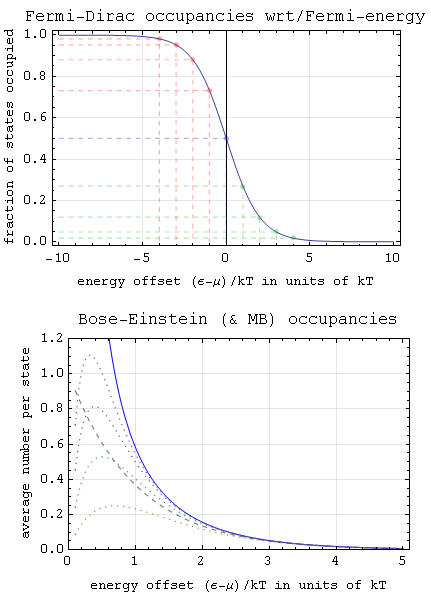
Quantum occupancy nomograms.

The fundamental feature of quantum mechanics that distinguishes it from classical mechanics is that particles of a particular type are indistinguishable from one another. This means that in an ensemble of similar particles, interchanging any two particles does not lead to a new configuration of the system. In the language of quantum mechanics this means that the wave function of the system is invariant up to a phase with respect to the interchange of the constituent particles. In the case of a system consisting of particles of different kinds (for example, electrons and protons), the wave function of the system is invariant up to a phase separately for both assemblies of particles.

The applicable definition of a particle does not require it to be elementary or even "microscopic", but it requires that all its degrees of freedom (or internal states) that are relevant to the physical problem considered shall be known. All quantum particles, such as leptons and baryons, in the universe have three translational motion degrees of freedom (represented with the wave function) and one discrete degree of freedom, known as spin. Progressively more "complex" particles obtain progressively more internal freedoms (such as various quantum numbers in an atom), and, when the number of internal states that "identical" particles in an ensemble can occupy dwarfs their count (the particle number), then effects of quantum statistics become negligible. That's why quantum statistics is useful when one considers, say, helium liquid or ammonia gas (its molecules have a large, but conceivable number of internal states), but is useless applied to systems constructed of macromolecules.

While this difference between classical and quantum descriptions of systems is fundamental to all of quantum statistics, quantum particles are divided into two further classes on the basis of the symmetry of the system. The spin–statistics theorem binds two particular kinds of combinatorial symmetry with two particular kinds of spin symmetry, namely bosons and fermions.

== See also ==
- Bose–Einstein statistics
- Fermi–Dirac statistics
