= Strangeness =

Property of elementary particles

In particle physics, strangeness (symbol S) is a property of particles, expressed as a quantum number, for describing decay of particles in strong and electromagnetic interactions that occur in a short period of time. The strangeness of a particle is defined as:
$$S = -(n_\text{s} - n_{\bar{\text{s}}})$$
where n_{s} represents the number of strange quarks (s) and n_{s̅} represents the number of strange antiquarks (s̅). Evaluation of strangeness production has become an important tool in search, discovery, observation and interpretation of quark–gluon plasma (QGP). Strangeness is an excited state of matter and its decay is governed by CKM mixing.

The terms strange and strangeness predate the discovery of the quark, and were adopted after its discovery in order to preserve the continuity of the phrase: strangeness of particles as −1 and anti-particles as +1, per the original definition. For all the quark flavour quantum numbers (strangeness, charm, topness and bottomness) the convention is that the flavour charge and the electric charge of a quark have the same sign. With this, any flavour carried by a charged meson has the same sign as its charge.

== Conservation ==
The baryon decuplet shows twelve baryons formed by a combination of three u, d or s-quarks, with a total spin of 3/2. The vertical axis (S) indicates strangeness.

Strangeness was introduced by Murray Gell-Mann, Abraham Pais, Tadao Nakano and Kazuhiko Nishijima to explain the fact that certain particles, such as the kaons or the hyperons Σ and Λ, were created easily in particle collisions, yet decayed much more slowly than expected for their large masses and large production cross sections. Noting that collisions seemed to always produce pairs of these particles, it was postulated that a new conserved quantity, dubbed "strangeness", was preserved during their creation, but not conserved in their decay.

In our modern understanding, strangeness is conserved during the strong and the electromagnetic interactions, but not during the weak interactions. Consequently, the lightest particles containing a strange quark cannot decay by the strong interaction, and must instead decay via the much slower weak interaction. In most cases these decays change the value of the strangeness by one unit. This doesn't necessarily hold in second-order weak reactions, however, where there are mixes of K^{0} and K̅^{0} mesons. All in all, the amount of strangeness can change in a weak interaction reaction by +1, 0 or −1 (depending on the reaction).

For example, the interaction of a K^{−} meson with a proton is represented as:
$$K^-+p \rightarrow \Xi^0+K^0$$
$$(-1) + (0) \rightarrow (-2) + (1)$$

Here strangeness is conserved and the interaction proceeds via the strong nuclear force.

Nonetheless, in reactions like the decay of the positive kaon:
$$K^+ \rightarrow \pi^+ + \pi^0$$
$$+1 \rightarrow (0) + (0)$$

Since both pions have a strangeness of 0, this violates conservation of strangeness, meaning the reaction must go via the weak force.

== See also ==
- Strangeness and quark–gluon plasma
- Strange particles
