= Charm (quantum number) =

Flavour quantum number

Charm (symbol C) is a flavour quantum number representing the difference between the number of charm quarks (c) and charm antiquarks (c̅) that are present in a particle:

$$C = n_\text{c} - n_{\mathrm{\bar{c}}}\$$

By convention, the sign of flavour quantum numbers agree with the sign of the electric charge carried by the quarks of corresponding flavour. The charm quark, which carries an electric charge (Q) of +2/3, therefore carries a charm of +1. The charm antiquarks have the opposite charge (Q = −2/3), and flavour quantum numbers (C = −1).

As with any flavour-related quantum numbers, charm is preserved under strong and electromagnetic interaction, but not under weak interaction (see CKM matrix). For first-order weak decays, that is processes involving only one quark decay, charm can only vary by 1 (ΔC= ±1,0). Since first-order processes are more common than second-order processes (involving two quark decays), this can be used as an approximate "selection rule" for weak decays.

== See also ==
- Quantum number
