= List of mesons =

The decay of a kaon (K^{+}) into three pions (2 π^{+}, 1 π^{−}) is a process that involves both weak and strong interactions. Weak interactions: The strange antiquark (s̅) of the kaon transmutes into an up antiquark (u̅) by the emission of a W^{+} boson; the W^{+} boson subsequently decays into a down antiquark (d̅) and an up quark (u). Strong interactions: An up quark (u) emits a gluon (g) which decays into a down quark (d) and a down antiquark (d̅).

This list is of all known and predicted scalar, pseudoscalar and vector mesons. See list of particles for a more detailed list of particles found in particle physics.

This article contains a list of mesons, unstable subatomic particles composed of one quark and one antiquark. They are part of the hadron particle family—particles made of quarks. The other members of the hadron family are the baryons—subatomic particles composed of three quarks. The main difference between mesons and baryons is that mesons have integer spin (thus are bosons) while baryons are fermions (half-integer spin). Because mesons are bosons, the Pauli exclusion principle does not apply to them. Because of this, they can act as force mediating particles on short distances, and thus play a part in processes such as the nuclear interaction.

Since mesons are composed of quarks, they participate in both the weak and strong interactions. Mesons with net electric charge also participate in the electromagnetic interaction. They are classified according to their quark content, total angular momentum, parity, and various other properties such as C-parity and G-parity. While no meson is stable, those of lower mass are nonetheless more stable than the most massive mesons, and are easier to observe and study in particle accelerators or in cosmic ray experiments. They are also typically less massive than baryons, meaning that they are more easily produced in experiments, and will exhibit higher-energy phenomena sooner than baryons would. For example, the charm quark was first seen in the J/Psi meson (J/ψ) in 1974, and the bottom quark in the upsilon meson (ϒ) in 1977. The top quark (the last and heaviest quark to be discovered to date) was first observed at Fermilab in 1995.

Each meson has a corresponding antiparticle (antimeson) where quarks are replaced by their corresponding antiquarks and vice versa. For example, a positive pion (π^{+}) is made of one up quark and one down antiquark; and its corresponding antiparticle, the negative pion (π^{−}), is made of one up antiquark and one down quark. Although tetraquarks with two quarks and two antiquarks can be considered mesons they are not listed here.

The symbols encountered in these lists are: P (parity), C (C-parity), G (G-parity), u (up quark), d (down quark), s (strange quark), c (charm quark), b (bottom quark), I (isospin), J (total angular momentum), Q (charge), B (baryon number), S (strangeness), C (charm), and B′ (bottomness), as well as a wide array of subatomic particles (hover mouse for name).

== Summary table ==
Because this table was initially derived from published results and many of those results were preliminary, as many as 64 of the mesons in the following table may not exist or have the wrong mass or quantum numbers.

Nomenclature of flavourless mesons
qq̅ content	I	J^{PC (Note: C-parity is only relevant for neutral mesons.)}			
qq̅ content	I	0^{−+}, 2^{−+}, 4^{−+}, ...	1^{+−}, 3^{+−}, 5^{+−}, ...	1^{−−}, 2^{−−}, 3^{−−}, ...	0^{++}, 1^{++}, 2^{++}, ...
ud̅ $\mathrm{\tfrac{u\bar{u} - d\bar{d}}{\sqrt{2}}}$ du̅	1	π^{+} π^{0} π^{−}	b^{+} b^{0} b^{−}	ρ^{+} ρ^{0} ρ^{−}	a^{+} a^{0} a^{−}
Mix of uu̅, dd̅, ss̅	0	η η′	h h′	ω ϕ	f f′
cc̅	0	η_{c}	h_{c}	ψ (Note: For the special case J^{PC} = 1^{−−}, the ψ is called the J/ψ)	χ_{c}
bb̅	0	η_{b}	h_{b}	ϒ	χ_{b}
tt̅	0	η_{t}	h_{t}	θ	χ_{t}

Nomenclature of flavoured mesons
Quark	Antiquark					
Quark	up	down	charm	strange	top	bottom
up	—N/a	(Note: For the purpose of nomenclature, the isospin projection I_{3} is treated as if it were not a flavour quantum number. This means that the charged pion-like mesons (π^{±}, a^{±}, b^{±}, and ρ^{±} mesons) follow the rules of flavourless mesons, even if they aren't truly "flavourless".)	D̅^{0}	K^{+}	T̅^{0}	B^{+}
down		—N/a	D^{−}	K^{0}	T^{−}	B^{0}
charm	D^{0}	D^{+}	—N/a	D^{+}_{s}	T̅^{0}_{c}	B^{+}_{c}
strange	K^{−}	K̅^{0}	D^{−}_{s}	—N/a	T^{−}_{s}	B^{0}_{s}
top	T^{0}	T^{+}	T^{0}_{c}	T^{+}_{s}	—N/a	T^{+}_{b}
bottom	B^{−}	B̅^{0}	B^{−}_{c}	B̅^{0}_{s}	T^{−}_{b}	—N/a

Meson summary table
Light unflavoured (S = C = B = 0)				Strange (S = ±1, C = B = 0)		Charmed, strange (C = S = ±1)		cc̅	
	I^{G}(J^{PC})		I^{G}(J^{PC})		I(J^{P})		I(J^{P})		I^{G}(J^{PC})
π^{±}	1^{−}(0^{−})	Φ(1680)	0^{−}(1^{−−})	K^{±}	1/2(0^{−})	D^{±}_{s}	0(0^{−})	η_{c}(1S)	0^{+}(0^{−+})
π^{0}	1^{−}(0^{−+})	ρ_{3}(1690)	1^{+}(3^{−−})	K^{0}	1/2(0^{−})	D^{*±}_{s}	0(1^{−})	J/ψ(1S)	0^{−}(1^{−−})
η	0^{+}(0^{−+})	ρ(1700)	1^{+}(1^{−−})	K^{0}_{S}	1/2(0^{−})	D^{*}_{s0}(2317)^{±}	0(0^{+})	χ_{c0}(1P)	0^{+}(0^{++})
f_{0}(500)	0^{+}(0^{++})	a_{2}(1700)	1^{−}(2^{++})	K^{0}_{L}	1/2(0^{−})	D_{s1}(2460)^{±}	0(1^{+})	χ_{c1}(1P)	0^{+}(1^{++})
ρ(770)	1^{+}(1^{−−})	f_{0}(1710)	0^{+}(0^{++})	K^{*}_{0}(800)	1/2(0^{+})	D_{s1}(2536)^{±}	0(1^{+})	h_{c}(1P)	0^{−}(1^{+−})
ω(782)	0^{−}(1^{−−})	η(1760)	0^{+}(0^{−+})	K^{*}(892)	1/2(1^{−})	D^{*}_{s2}(2573)	0(2^{+})	χ_{c2}(1P)	0^{+}(2^{++})
η′ (958)	0^{+}(0^{−+})	π(1800)	1^{−}(0^{−+})	K_{1}(1270)	1/2(1^{+})	D^{*}_{s1}(2700)^{±}	0(1^{−})	η_{c}(2S)	0^{+}(0^{−+})
f_{0}(980)	0^{+}(0^{++})	f_{2}(1810)	0^{+}(2^{++})	K_{1}(1400)	1/2(1^{+})	D^{*}_{s3}(2860)^{±}	0(3^{−})	ψ(2S)	0^{−}(1^{−−})
a_{0}(980)	1^{−}(0^{++})	X(1835)	0^{+}(0^{−+})	K^{*}(1410)	1/2(1^{−})	D_{sJ}(3040)^{±}	0(?^{?})	ψ(3770)	0^{−}(1^{−−})
φ(1020)	0^{−}(1^{−−})	φ_{3}(1850)	0^{−}(3^{−−})	K^{*}_{0}(1430)	1/2(0^{+})	Bottom (B = ±1)		ψ_{2}(3823)	0^{−}(2^{−−})
h_{1}(1170)	0^{−}(1^{+−})	η_{1}(1855)	0^{+}(2^{−+})	K^{*}_{2}(1430)	1/2(2^{+})	Bottom (B = ±1)		χ_{c1}(3872)	0^{+}(1^{++})
b_{1}(1235)	1^{+}(1^{+−})	η_{2}(1870)	0^{+}(2^{−+})	K(1460)	1/2(0^{−})	B^{±}	1/2(0^{−})	X(3900)^{±}	?(1^{+})
a_{1}(1260)	1^{−}(1^{++})	π_{2}(1880)	1^{−}(2^{−+})	K_{2}(1580)	1/2(2^{−})	B^{0}	1/2(0^{−})	X(3900)^{0}	?(?^{?})
f_{2}(1270)	0^{+}(2^{++})	ρ(1900)	1^{+}(1^{−−})	K(1630)	1/2(?^{?})	B^{±}/B^{0} Admixture		χ_{c0}(2P)	0^{+}(0^{++})
f_{1}(1285)	0^{+}(1^{++})	f_{2}(1910)	0^{+}(2^{++})	K_{1}(1650)	1/2(1^{+})	B^{±}/B^{0}/B^{0}_{s}/b-baryon; Admixture		χ_{c2}(2P)	0^{+}(2^{++})
η(1295)	0^{+}(0^{−+})	f_{2}(1950)	0^{+}(2^{++})	K^{*}(1680)	1/2(1^{−})	B^{±}/B^{0}/B^{0}_{s}/b-baryon; Admixture		X(3940)	?^{?}(?^{??})
π(1300)	1^{−}(0^{−+})	ρ_{3}(1990)	1^{+}(3^{−−})	K_{2}(1770)	1/2(2^{−})	V_{cb} and V_{ub} CKM Matrix; Admixture		X(4020)^{±}	?(?^{?})
a_{2}(1320)	1^{−}(2^{++})	f_{2}(2010)	0^{+}(2^{++})	K^{*}_{3}(1780)	1/2(3^{−})	V_{cb} and V_{ub} CKM Matrix; Admixture		ψ(4040)	0^{−}(1^{−−})
f_{0}(1370)	0^{+}(0^{++})	f_{0}(2020)	0^{+}(0^{++})	K_{2}(1820)	1/2(2^{−})	B^{*}	1/2(1^{−})	X(4050)^{±}	?(?^{?})
h_{1}(1415)	0^{−}(1^{+−})	a_{4}(1970)	1^{−}(4^{++})	K(1830)	1/2(0^{−})	B^{*}_{J}(5732)	?(?^{?})	X(4140)	0^{+}(?^{?+})
π_{1}(1400)	1^{−}(1^{−+})	f_{4}(2050)	0^{+}(4^{++})	K^{*}_{0}(1950)	1/2(0^{+})	B_{1}(5721)^{0}	1/2(1^{+})	ψ(4160)	0^{−}(1^{−−})
η(1405)	0^{+}(0^{−+})	π_{2}(2100)	1^{−}(2^{−+})	K^{*}_{2}(1980)	1/2(2^{+})	B^{*}_{1}(5721)^{0}	1/2(2^{+})	X(4160)	?^{?}(?^{??})
f_{1}(1420)	0^{+}(1^{++})	f_{0}(2100)	0^{+}(0^{++})	K^{*}_{0}(2045)	1/2(4^{+})	Bottom, strange (B = ±1, S = ∓1)		X(4250)^{±}	?(?^{?})
ω(1420)	0^{−}(1^{−−})	f_{2}(2150)	0^{+}(2^{++})	K_{2}(2250)	1/2(2^{−})	Bottom, strange (B = ±1, S = ∓1)		X(4260)	?^{?}(1^{−−})
f_{2}(1430)	0^{+}(2^{++})	ρ(2150)	1^{+}(1^{−−})	K_{3}(2320)	1/2(3^{+})	B^{0}_{s}	0(0^{−})	X(4350)	0^{+}(?^{?+})
a_{0}(1450)	1^{−}(0^{++})	φ(2170)	0^{−}(1^{−−})	K^{*}_{5}(2380)	1/2(5^{−})	B^{*}_{s}	0(1^{−})	ψ(4360)	0^{−}(1^{−−})
ρ(1450)	1^{+}(1^{−−})	f_{0}(2200)	0^{+}(0^{++})	K_{4}(2500)	1/2(4^{−})	B_{s1}(5830)^{0}	0(1^{+})	ψ(4415)	0^{−}(1^{−−})
η(1475)	0^{+}(0^{−+})	f_{J}(2220)	0^{+}(2^{++} or 4^{++})	K(3100)	?^{?}(?^{??})	B^{*}_{s2}(5840)^{0}	0(2^{+})	X(4430)^{±}	?(1^{+})
f_{0}(1500)	0^{+}(0^{++})	f_{J}(2220)	0^{+}(2^{++} or 4^{++})	Charmed (C = ±1)		B^{*}_{sJ}(5850)	?(?^{?})	ψ(4660)	0^{−}(1^{−−})
f_{1}(1510)	0^{+}(1^{++})	η(2225)	0^{+}(0^{−+})	Charmed (C = ±1)		Bottom, charmed (B = C = ±1)		bb̅	
f′_{2}(1525)	0^{+}(2^{++})	ρ_{3}(2250)	1^{+}(3^{−−})	D^{±}	1/2(0^{−})	Bottom, charmed (B = C = ±1)		η_{b}(1S)	0^{+}(0^{−+})
f_{2}(1565)	0^{+}(2^{++})	f_{2}(2300)	0^{+}(2^{++})	D^{0}	1/2(0^{−})	B^{+}_{c}	0(0^{−})	Υ(1S)	0^{−}(1^{−−})
ρ(1570)	1^{+}(1^{−−})	f_{4}(2300)	0^{+}(4^{++})	D^{*}(2007)^{0}	1/2(1^{−})	B_{c}(2S)^{±}	0(0^{−})	χ_{b0}(1P)	0^{+}(0^{++})
h_{1}(1595)	0^{−}(1^{+−})	f_{0}(2330)	0^{+}(0^{++})	D^{*}(2010)^{±}	1/2(1^{−})			χ_{b1}(1P)	0^{+}(1^{++})
π_{1}(1600)	1^{−}(1^{−+})	f_{2}(2340)	0^{+}(2^{++})	D^{*}_{0}(2400)^{0}	1/2(0^{+})			χ_{b0}(2P)	0^{+}(0^{++})
a_{1}(1640)	1^{−}(1^{++})	ρ_{5}(2350)	1^{+}(5^{−−})	D^{*}_{0}(2400)^{±}	1/2(0^{+})			h_{b}(1P)	0^{−}(1^{+−})
f_{2}(1640)	0^{+}(2^{++})	a_{6}(2450)	1^{−}(6^{++})	D_{1}(2420)^{0}	1/2(1^{+})			χ_{b2}(1P)	0^{+}(2^{++})
η_{2}(1645)	0^{+}(2^{−+})	f_{6}(2510)	0^{+}(6^{++})	D_{1}(2420)^{±}	1/2(?^{?})			η_{b}(2S)	0^{+}(0^{−+})
ω(1650)	0^{−}(1^{−−})	Other light		D_{1}(2430)^{0}	1/2(1^{+})			Υ(2S)	0^{−}(1^{−−})
ω_{3}(1670)	0^{−}(3^{−−})	Further States		D^{*}_{2}(2460)^{0}	1/2(2^{+})			Υ(1D)	0^{−}(2^{−−})
π_{2}(1670)	1^{−}(2^{−+})	Further states		D^{*}_{2}(2460)^{±}	1/2(2^{+})			χ_{b0}(2P)	0^{+}(0^{++})
		Further states		D(2550)^{0}	1/2(0^{−})			χ_{b1}(2P)	0^{+}(1^{++})
		Further states		D(2600)	1/2(?^{?})			h_{b}(2P)	0^{−}(1^{+−})
		Further states		D^{*}(2640)^{±}	1/2(?^{?})			χ_{b2}(2P)	0^{+}(2^{++})
		Further states		D(2750)	1/2(?^{?})			Υ(3S)	0^{−}(1^{−−})
		Further states						χ_{b}(3P)	?^{?}(?^{?+})
		Further states						Υ(4S)	0^{−}(1^{−−})
		Further states						X(10610)^{±}	1^{+}(1^{+})
		Further states						X(10610)^{0}	1^{+}(1^{+})
		Further states						X(10650)^{±}	?^{+}(1^{+})
		Further states						Υ(10860)	0^{−}(1^{−−})
		Further states						Υ(11020)	0^{−}(1^{−−})

Mesons named with the letter "f" are scalar mesons (as opposed to a pseudo-scalar meson), and mesons named with the letter "a" are axial-vector mesons (as opposed to an ordinary vector meson) a.k.a. an isoscalar vector meson, while the letters "b" and "h" refer to axial-vector mesons with positive parity, negative C-parity, and quantum numbers I^{G} of 1^{+} and 0^{−} respectively.

The, "f", "a", "b" and "h" mesons are not listed in the tables below and their internal structure and quark content is a matter of ongoing investigation. The particle described in the table above as f_{0}(500) has historically been known by two other names: f_{0}(600) and σ (sigma).

A complete set of meson naming conventions is set forth in a 2017 review article for the Particle Data Group which also contains a table mapping pre-2016 common names to the new Particle Data Group standard naming conventions for XYZ mesons.

== Meson properties ==
The following lists details for all known and predicted pseudoscalar (J^{P} = 0^{−}) and vector (J^{P} = 1^{−}) mesons.

The properties and quark content of the particles are tabulated below; for the corresponding antiparticles, simply change quarks into antiquarks (and vice versa) and flip the sign of Q, B, S, C, and B′. Particles with ^{†} next to their names have been predicted by the Standard Model but not yet observed. Values in red have not been firmly established by experiments, but are predicted by the quark model and are consistent with the measurements.

=== Pseudoscalar mesons ===
Particle name	Particle symbol	Antiparticle symbol	Quark content	Rest mass [MeV/c^{2}]	Charge radii [fm]	I^{G}	J^{PC}	S	C	B′	Mean lifetime [s]	Commonly decays to (>5% of decays)
Pion	π^{+}	π^{−}	ud̅	139.57018±0.00035	0.659 ± 0.004	1^{−}	0^{−}	0	0	0	(2.6033±0.0005)×10^{−8}	μ^{+} + ν_{μ}
Pion	π^{0}	Self	$\mathrm{\tfrac{u\bar{u} - d\bar{d}}{\sqrt{2}}}\,$^{^{[a]}}	134.9766±0.0006		1^{−}	0^{−+}	0	0	0	(8.52±0.18)×10^{−17}	γ + γ
Eta meson	η	Self	$\mathrm{\tfrac{u\bar{u} + d\bar{d} - 2s\bar{s}}{\sqrt{6}}}\,$^{^{[a]}}	547.862±0.018	0.68	0^{+}	0^{−+}	0	0	0	(5.02±0.19)×10^{−19}^{^{[b]}}	γ + γ or π^{0} + π^{0} + π^{0} or π^{+} + π^{0} + π^{−}
Eta prime meson	η′(958)	Self	$\tfrac\mathrm{u\bar{u} + d\bar{d} + s\bar{s}}{\sqrt{3}}\,$^{^{[a]}}	957.78±0.06		0^{+}	0^{−+}	0	0	0	(3.32±0.15)×10^{−21}^{^{[b]}}	π^{+} + π^{−} + η or (ρ^{0} + γ) / (π^{+} + π^{−} + γ) or π^{0} + π^{0} + η
Charmed eta meson	η_{c}(1S)	Self	cc̅	2983.6±0.7	0.2090	0^{+}	0^{−+}	0	0	0	(2.04±0.05)×10^{−23}^{^{[b]}}	See η_{c} decay modes
Bottom eta meson	η_{b}(1S)	Self	bb̅	9398.0±3.2	0.0700	0^{+}	0^{−+}	0	0	0	(6.58±0.15)×10^{−23}^{^{[b]}}	See η_{b} decay modes
Kaon	K^{+}	K^{−}	us̅	493.677±0.016	0.34	1/2	0^{−}	1	0	0	(1.2380±0.0021)×10^{−8}	μ^{+} + ν_{μ} or π^{+} + π^{0} or π^{0} + e^{+} + ν_{e} or π^{+} + π^{+} + π^{−}
Kaon	K^{0}	K̅^{0}	ds̅	497.614±0.024	−0.076	1/2	0^{−}	1	0	0	^{^{[c]}}	^{^{[c]}}
K-Short	K^{0}_{S}	Self	$\mathrm{\tfrac{d\bar{s} - s\bar{d}}{\sqrt{2}}}\,$^{^{[e]}}	497.614±0.024^{^{[d]}}		1/2	0^{−}	(*)	0	0	(8.954±0.004)×10^{−11}	π^{+} + π^{−} or π^{0} + π^{0}
K-Long	K^{0}_{L}	Self	$\mathrm{\tfrac{d\bar{s} + s\bar{d}}{\sqrt{2}}}\,$^{^{[e]}}	497.614±0.024^{^{[d]}}		1/2	0^{−}	(*)	0	0	(5.116±0.021)×10^{−8}	π^{±} + e^{∓} + ν_{e} or π^{±} + μ^{∓} + ν_{μ} or π^{0} + π^{0} + π^{0} or π^{+} + π^{0} + π^{−}
D meson	D^{+}	D^{−}	cd̅	1869.61±0.10	0.260	1/2	0^{−}	0	+1	0	(1.040±0.007)×10^{−12}	See D^{+} decay modes
D meson	D^{0}	D̅^{0}	cu̅	1864.84±0.07	−0.453	1/2	0^{−}	0	+1	0	(4.101±0.015)×10^{−13}	See D^{0} decay modes
Strange D meson	D^{+}_{s}	D^{−}_{s}	cs̅	1968.30±0.11	0.216	0	0^{−}	+1	+1	0	(5.00±0.07)×10^{−13}	See D^{+}_{s} decay modes
B meson	B^{+}	B^{−}	ub̅	5279.26±0.17	0.536	1/2	0^{−}	0	0	+1	(1.638±0.004)×10^{−12}	See B^{+} decay modes
B meson	B^{0}	B̅^{0}	db̅	5279.58±0.17	−0.266	1/2	0^{−}	0	0	+1	(1.519±0.009)×10^{−12}	See B^{0} decay modes
Strange B meson	B^{0}_{s}	B̅^{0}_{s}	sb̅	5366.77±0.24	−0.214	0	0^{−}	−1	0	+1	(1.512±0.007)×10^{−12}	See B^{0}_{s} decay modes
Charmed B meson	B^{+}_{c}	B^{−}_{c}	cb̅	6275.6±1.1		0	0^{−}	0	+1	+1	(4.52±0.33)×10^{−13}	See B^{+}_{c} decay modes

^{[a]} Makeup inexact due to non-zero quark masses.
^{[b]} PDG reports the resonance width (Γ). Here the conversion τ = ħ/Γ is given instead.
^{[c]} Strong eigenstate. No definite lifetime (see kaon notes below)
^{[d]} The mass of the K^{0}_{L} and K^{0}_{S} are given as that of the K^{0}. However, it is known that a difference between the masses of the K^{0}_{L} and K^{0}_{S} on the order of 2.2×10^{−11} MeV/c^{2} exists.
^{[e]} Weak eigenstate. Makeup is missing small CP-violating term (see notes on neutral kaons below).

=== Vector mesons ===
Particle name	Particle symbol	Antiparticle symbol	Quark content	Rest mass [MeV/c^{2}]	I^{G}	J^{PC}	S	C	B′	Mean lifetime [s]	Commonly decays to (>5% of decays)
Charged rho meson	ρ^{+}(770)	ρ^{−}(770)	ud̅	775.11±0.34	1^{+}	1^{−}	0	0	0	(4.41±0.02)×10^{−24}^{^{[f]}^{[g]}}	π^{+} + π^{0}
Neutral rho meson	ρ^{0}(770)	Self	$\mathrm{\tfrac{u\bar{u}-d\bar{d}}{\sqrt 2}}$	775.26±0.25	1^{+}	1^{−−}	0	0	0	(4.45±0.03)×10^{−24}^{^{[f]}^{[g]}}	π^{+} + π^{−}
Omega meson	ω(782)	Self	$\mathrm{\tfrac{u\bar{u}+d\bar{d}}{\sqrt 2}}$	782.65±0.12	0^{−}	1^{−−}	0	0	0	(7.75±0.07)×10^{−23}^{^{[f]}}	π^{+} + π^{0} + π^{−} or π^{0} + γ
Phi meson	ϕ(1020)	Self	ss̅	1019.461±0.019	0^{−}	1^{−−}	0	0	0	(1.54±0.01)×10^{−22}^{^{[f]}}	K^{+} + K^{−} or K^{0}_{S} + K^{0}_{L} or (ρ + π) / (π^{+} + π^{0} + π^{−})
J/psi meson	J/ψ	Self	cc̅	3096.916±0.011	0^{−}	1^{−−}	0	0	0	(7.09±0.21)×10^{−21}^{^{[f]}}	See J/ψ(1S) decay modes
Upsilon meson	ϒ(1S)	Self	bb̅	9460.30±0.26	0^{−}	1^{−−}	0	0	0	(1.22±0.03)×10^{−20}^{^{[f]}}	See ϒ(1S) decay modes
Kaon	K^{∗+}	K^{∗−}	us̅	891.66±0.26	1/2	1^{−}	1	0	0	(3.26±0.06)×10^{−23}^{^{[f]}^{[g]}}	K^{+} + π^{0} or K^{0} + π^{+}
Kaon	K^{∗0}	K̅^{∗0}	ds̅	895.81±0.19	1/2	1^{−}	1	0	0	(1.39±0.02)×10^{−23}^{^{[f]}}	K^{+} + π^{−} or K^{0} + π^{0}
D meson	D^{∗+}(2010)	D^{∗−}(2010)	cd̅	2010.26±0.07	1/2	1^{−}	0	+1	0	(7.89±0.17)×10^{−21}^{^{[f]}}	D^{0} + π^{+} or D^{+} + π^{0}
D meson	D^{∗0}(2007)	D̅^{∗0}(2007)	cu̅	2006.96±0.10	1/2	1^{−}	0	+1	0	>3.1×10^{−22}^{^{[f]}}	D^{0} + π^{0} or D^{0} + γ
Strange D meson	D^{∗+}_{s}	D^{∗−}_{s}	cs̅	2112.1±0.4	0	1^{−}	+1	+1	0	>3.4×10^{−22}^{^{[f]}}	D^{+}_{s} + γ or D^{+}_{s} + π^{0}
B meson	B^{∗+}	B^{∗−}	ub̅	5325.2±0.4	1/2	1^{−}	0	0	+1	Unknown	B^{+} + γ
B meson	B^{∗0}	B̅^{∗0}	db̅	5325.2±0.4	1/2	1^{−}	0	0	+1	Unknown	B^{0} + γ
Strange B meson	B^{∗0}_{s}	B̅^{∗0}_{s}	sb̅	5415.4+2.4 −2.1	0	1^{−}	−1	0	+1	Unknown	B^{0}_{s} + γ
Charmed B meson^{†}	B^{∗+}_{c}	B^{∗−}_{c}	cb̅	Unknown	0	1^{−}	0	+1	+1	Unknown	Unknown

^{[f]} PDG reports the resonance width (Γ). Here the conversion τ = ħ/Γ is given instead.
^{[g]} The exact value depends on the method used. See the given reference for detail.

=== Notes on neutral kaons ===
There are two complications with neutral kaons:

- Due to neutral kaon mixing, the K^{0}_{S} and K^{0}_{L} are not eigenstates of strangeness. However, they are eigenstates of the weak force, which determines how they decay, so these are the particles with definite lifetime.
- The linear combinations given in the table for the K^{0}_{S} and K^{0}_{L} are not exactly correct, since there is a small correction due to CP violation. See CP violation in kaons.

Note that these issues also exist in principle for other neutral flavored mesons; however, the weak eigenstates are considered separate particles only for kaons because of their dramatically different lifetimes.

== See also ==
- List of baryons
- List of particles
- Pseudovector meson
- Timeline of particle discoveries
