= Rho meson =

Short-lived hadronic particle that is an isospin triplet

- Composition: ρ^{+} : ud̅; ρ^{0} : $\rm \tfrac{u\overline{u} - d\overline{d}}{\sqrt{2}}$; ρ^{−} : du̅
- Statistics: Bosonic
- Family: Mesons
- Interactions: Strong, Weak, Gravitational and Electromagnetic
- Symbol: ρ^{+}, ρ^{0}, and ρ^{−}
- Antiparticle: ρ^{+}: ρ^{−}; ρ^{0}: self
- Types: 3
- Mass: ~770 MeV/c^{2} (Note: The exact value depends on the method used. See the given reference for detail. In the table, data used is from tau decays and electron–positron annihilation.)
- Mean lifetime: ~4.5×10^{−24} s (Note: PDG reports the resonance width (Γ). Here the conversion τ = ħ/Γ is given instead.)
- Decays into: ρ^{±}: π^{±} + π^{0}; ρ^{0}: π^{+} + π^{−}
- Electric charge: ρ^{±}: ±1 e; ρ^{0}: 0 e
- Color charge: 0
- Spin: 1
- Isospin: ρ^{±}: ±1; ρ^{0}: 0
- Hypercharge: 0
- Parity: −1
- C parity: −1

In particle physics, a rho meson is a short-lived hadronic particle that is an isospin triplet whose three states are denoted as ρ^{+}, ρ^{0} and ρ^{−}. Along with pions and omega mesons, the rho meson carries the nuclear force within the atomic nucleus. After the octet consisting of the pions, kaons, and eta meson, the rho mesons are the lightest strongly interacting particle, with a mass of about 775 MeV for all three states. (Note: There must be a small mass difference between the charged ρ^{+} and the neutral ρ^{0} that can be attributed to electromagnetic self-energy of the particle as well as the quark masses; however, the current experimental data are unable to show a significant difference.)

The rho mesons have a very short lifetime and their decay width is about 145 MeV; because that is large compared with the mass, the resonance width measurably deviates from a Breit–Wigner form. The principal decay route of the rho mesons is to a pair of pions with a branching rate of 99.9% (however, all neutral pions is forbidden). (Note: Neutral rho mesons can decay to a pair of electrons or muons which occurs with a branching ratio of 5×10^{−5}. This decay of the neutral rho to leptons can be interpreted as a mixing between the photon and rho. In principle the charged rho mesons mix with the weak vector bosons and can lead to decay to an electron or muon plus a neutrino; however, this has never been observed.)

== History ==
After several false starts, the ρ meson and the ω meson were discovered at Lawrence Berkeley Laboratory in 1961.

== Composition ==
The rho mesons can be interpreted as a bound state of a quark and an anti-quark and is an excited version of the pion. Unlike the pion, the rho meson has spin j = 1 (a vector meson) and a much higher value of the mass. They attribute this mass difference between the pions and rho mesons to a large hyperfine interaction between the quark and anti-quark, although an objection with the De Rujula–Georgi–Glashow description is that it attributes the lightness of the pions as an accident rather than a result of chiral symmetry breaking.

The rho mesons can be thought of as the gauge bosons of a spontaneously broken gauge symmetry whose local character is emergent (arising from QCD); Note that this broken gauge symmetry (sometimes called hidden local symmetry) is distinct from the global chiral symmetry acting on the flavors. This was described by Howard Georgi in a paper titled "The Vector Limit of Chiral Symmetry" where he ascribed much of the literature of hidden local symmetry to a non-linear sigma model.

Rho mesons
Particle name	Particle symbol	Antiparticle symbol	Quark content	Mass (MeV/c^{2})	I^{G}	J^{PC}	S	C	B'	Mean lifetime (s)	Commonly decays to (>5% of decays)
Charged rho meson	ρ^{+}(770)	ρ^{−}(770)	ud̅	775.11±0.34	1^{+}	1^{−}	0	0	0	(4.415±0.024)×10^{−24}	π^{±} + π^{0}
Neutral rho meson	ρ^{0}(770)	Self	$\mathrm{\tfrac{u\bar{u}-d\bar{d}}{\sqrt 2}}\,$	775.26±0.25	1^{+}	1^{−−}	0	0	0	(4.453±0.027)×10^{−24}	π^{+} + π^{−}
