= Meson =

Subatomic particle; made of equal numbers of quarks and antiquarks

Mesons
- Mesons of spin 0 form a nonet
- Composition: composite: quarks and antiquarks
- Statistics: bosonic
- Family: hadron
- Interactions: strong, weak, electromagnetic and gravitational
- Theorized: Hideki Yukawa (1935)
- Discovered: 1947
- Types: ~140 (list)
- Mass: from 134.9 MeV/c^{2} (π^{0}) to 9.460 GeV/c^{2} (ϒ)
- Electric charge: −1 e, 0 e, +1 e
- Spin: 0 ħ, 1 ħ

In particle physics, a meson (/ˈmiːzɒn, ˈmɛzɒn/) is a type of hadronic subatomic particle composed of an equal number of quarks and antiquarks, usually one of each, bound together by the strong interaction. Because mesons are composed of quark subparticles, they have a meaningful physical size, a diameter of roughly one femtometre (10^{−15} m), which is about 0.6 times the size of a proton or neutron. All mesons are unstable, with the longest-lived lasting for only a few tenths of a nanosecond. Heavier mesons decay to lighter mesons and ultimately to stable electrons, neutrinos and photons.

Outside the nucleus, mesons appear in nature only as short-lived products of very high-energy collisions between particles made of quarks, such as cosmic rays (high-energy protons and neutrons) and baryonic matter. Mesons are routinely produced artificially in cyclotrons or other particle accelerators in the collisions of protons, antiprotons, or other particles.

Higher-energy (more massive) mesons were created momentarily in the Big Bang, but are not thought to play a role in nature today. However, such heavy mesons are regularly created in particle accelerator experiments that explore the nature of the heavier quarks that compose the heavier mesons.

Mesons are part of the hadron particle family, which are defined simply as particles composed of two or more quarks. The other members of the hadron family are the baryons: subatomic particles composed of odd numbers of valence quarks (at least three), and some experiments show evidence of exotic mesons, which do not have the conventional valence quark content of two quarks (one quark and one antiquark), but four or more.

Because quarks have a spin 1/2, the difference in quark number between mesons and baryons results in conventional two-quark mesons being bosons, whereas baryons are fermions.

Each type of meson has a corresponding antiparticle (antimeson) in which quarks are replaced by their corresponding antiquarks and vice versa. For example, a positive pion (π^{+}) is made of one up quark and one down antiquark; and its corresponding antiparticle, the negative pion (π^{−}), is made of one up antiquark and one down quark.

Because mesons are composed of quarks, they participate in both the weak interaction and strong interaction. Mesons with net electric charge also participate in the electromagnetic interaction. Mesons are classified according to their quark content, total angular momentum, parity and various other properties, such as C-parity and G-parity. Although no meson is stable, those of lower mass are nonetheless more stable than the more massive, and hence are easier to observe and study in particle accelerators or in cosmic ray experiments. The lightest group of mesons is less massive than the lightest group of baryons, meaning that they are more easily produced in experiments, and thus exhibit certain higher-energy phenomena more readily than do baryons. But mesons can be quite massive: for example, the J/psi meson (J/ψ) containing the charm quark, first seen in 1974, is about three times as massive as a proton, and the upsilon meson (ϒ) containing the bottom quark, first seen in 1977, is about ten times as massive as a proton.

== History ==
From theoretical considerations, in 1934 Hideki Yukawa predicted the existence and the approximate mass of the "meson" as the carrier of the nuclear force that holds atomic nuclei together. If there were no nuclear force, all nuclei with two or more protons would fly apart due to electromagnetic repulsion. Yukawa called his carrier particle the meson, from μέσος mesos, the Greek word for "intermediate", because its predicted mass was between that of the electron and that of the proton, which has about 1,836 times the mass of the electron. Yukawa or Carl David Anderson, who discovered the muon, had originally named the particle the "mesotron", but he was corrected by the physicist Werner Heisenberg (whose father was a professor of Greek at LMU Munich). Heisenberg pointed out that there is no "tr" in the Greek word "mesos".

The first candidate for Yukawa's meson, in modern terminology known as the muon, was discovered in 1936 by Carl David Anderson and others in the decay products of cosmic ray interactions. The "mu meson" had about the right mass to be Yukawa's carrier of the strong nuclear force, but over the course of the next decade, it became evident that it was not the right particle. It was eventually found that the "mu meson" did not participate in the strong nuclear interaction at all, but rather behaved like a heavy version of the electron, and was eventually classed as a lepton like the electron, rather than a meson. In making this choice, physicists decided that properties other than particle mass should control their classification.

There were years of delays in the subatomic particle research during World War II (1939–1945), with most physicists working in applied projects for wartime necessities. When the war ended in August 1945, many physicists gradually returned to peacetime research. The first true meson to be discovered was what would later be called the "pi meson" (or pion). During 1939–1942, Debendra Mohan Bose and Bibha Chowdhuri exposed Ilford half-tone photographic plates in the high altitude mountainous regions of Darjeeling, and observed long curved ionizing tracks that appeared to be different from the tracks of alpha particles or protons. In a series of articles published in Nature, they identified a cosmic particle having an average mass close to 200 times the mass of the electron. This discovery was made in 1947 with improved full-tone photographic emulsion plates, by Cecil Powell, Hugh Muirhead, César Lattes, and Giuseppe Occhialini, who were investigating cosmic ray products at the University of Bristol in England, based on photographic films placed in the Andes mountains. Some of those mesons had about the same mass as the already-known mu "meson", yet seemed to decay into it, leading physicist Robert Marshak to hypothesize in 1947 that it was actually a new and different meson. Over the next few years, more experiments showed that the pion was indeed involved in strong interactions. The pion (as a virtual particle) is also used as a force carrier to model the nuclear force in atomic nuclei (between protons and neutrons). This is an approximation, as the actual carrier of the strong force is believed to be the gluon, which is explicitly used to model strong interaction between quarks. Other mesons, such as the virtual rho mesons are used to model this force as well, but to a lesser extent. Following the discovery of the pion, Yukawa was awarded the 1949 Nobel Prize in Physics for his predictions.

For a while in the past, the word meson was sometimes used to mean any force carrier, such as "the Z^{0} meson", which is involved in mediating the weak interaction. However, this use has fallen out of favor, and mesons are now defined as particles composed of pairs of quarks and antiquarks.

== Overview ==
=== Spin, orbital angular momentum, and total angular momentum ===
Spin (quantum number S) is a vector quantity that represents the "intrinsic" angular momentum of a particle. It comes in increments of 1/2 ħ. (Note: The ħ is often dropped because it is the "fundamental" unit of spin, and it is implied that "spin 1" means "spin 1 ħ". In some systems of natural units, ħ is chosen to be 1, and therefore drops out of equations. The remainder of this article uses the "assume ħ units" convention for all types of spin.)

Quarks are fermions—specifically in this case, particles having spin 1/2 (S = 1/2). Because spin projections vary in increments of 1 (that is 1 ħ), a single quark has a spin vector of length 1/2, and has two spin projections, either (S_{z} = +1/2 or S_{z} = − 1/2). Two quarks can have their spins aligned, in which case the two spin vectors add to make a vector of length S = 1, with three possible spin projections (S_{z} = +1, S_{z} = 0, and S_{z} = −1), and their combination is called a vector meson or spin-1 triplet. If two quarks have oppositely aligned spins, the spin vectors add up to make a vector of length S = 0, and only one spin projection (S_{z} = 0), called a scalar meson or spin-0 singlet. Because mesons are made of one quark and one antiquark, they are found in triplet and singlet spin states. The latter are called scalar mesons or pseudoscalar mesons, depending on their parity (see below).

There is another quantity of quantized angular momentum, called the orbital angular momentum (quantum number L), that is the angular momentum due to quarks orbiting each other, and also comes in increments of 1 ħ. The total angular momentum (quantum number J) of a particle is the combination of the two intrinsic angular momentums (spin) and the orbital angular momentum. It can take any value from J = |L − S| up to J = |L + S|, in increments of 1.

Meson angular momentum quantum numbers for L = 0, 1, 2, 3
S	L	P	J	J^{P}
0	0	−	0	0^{−}
0	1	+	1	1^{+}
0	2	−	2	2^{−}
0	3	+	3	3^{+}
1	0	−	1	1^{−}
1	1	+	2, 0	2^{+}, 0^{+}
1	2	−	3, 1	3^{−}, 1^{−}
1	3	+	4, 2	4^{+}, 2^{+}

Particle physicists are most interested in mesons with no orbital angular momentum (L = 0), therefore the two groups of mesons most studied are the S = 1; L = 0 and S = 0; L = 0, which corresponds to J = 1 and J = 0, although they are not the only ones. It is also possible to obtain J = 1 particles from S = 0 and L = 1. How to distinguish between the S = 1, L = 0 and S = 0, L = 1 mesons is an active area of research in meson spectroscopy.

=== P-parity ===
P-parity is left-right parity, or spatial parity, and was the first of several "parities" discovered, and so is often called just "parity". If the universe were reflected in a mirror, most laws of physics would be identical—things would behave the same way regardless of what we call "left" and what we call "right". This concept of mirror reflection is called parity (P). Gravity, the electromagnetic force, and the strong interaction all behave in the same way regardless of whether or not the universe is reflected in a mirror, and thus are said to conserve parity (P-symmetry). However, the weak interaction does distinguish "left" from "right", a phenomenon called parity violation (P-violation).

Based on this, one might think that, if the wavefunction for each particle (more precisely, the quantum field for each particle type) were simultaneously mirror-reversed, then the new set of wavefunctions would perfectly satisfy the laws of physics (apart from the weak interaction). It turns out that this is not quite true: In order for the equations to be satisfied, the wavefunctions of certain types of particles have to be multiplied by −1, in addition to being mirror-reversed. Such particle types are said to have negative or odd parity (P = −1, or alternatively P = −), whereas the other particles are said to have positive or even parity (P = +1, or alternatively P = +).

For mesons, parity is related to the orbital angular momentum by the relation:

$$P = \left( -1 \right)^{L + 1}$$

where the L is a result of the parity of the corresponding spherical harmonic of the wavefunction. The "+1" comes from the fact that, according to the Dirac equation, a quark and an antiquark have opposite intrinsic parities. Therefore, the intrinsic parity of a meson is the product of the intrinsic parities of the quark (+1) and antiquark (−1). As these are different, their product is −1, and so it contributes the "+1" that appears in the exponent.

As a consequence, all mesons with no orbital angular momentum (L = 0) have odd parity (P = −1).

=== C-parity ===
C-parity is only defined for mesons that are their own antiparticle (i.e. flavourless mesons). It represents whether or not the wavefunction of the meson remains the same under the interchange of their quark with their antiquark. If

$$|q\bar{q}\rangle = |\bar{q}q\rangle$$

then, the meson is "C even" (C = +1). On the other hand, if

$$|q\bar{q}\rangle = -|\bar{q}q\rangle$$

then the meson is "C odd" (C = −1).

C-parity rarely is studied on its own, but more commonly in combination with P-parity into CP-parity. CP-parity was originally thought to be conserved, but was later found to be violated on rare occasions in weak interactions.

=== G-parity ===
G-parity is a generalization of the C-parity. Instead of simply comparing the wavefunction after exchanging quarks and antiquarks, it compares the wavefunction after exchanging the meson for the corresponding antimeson, regardless of quark content. If

$$|q_1\bar{q}_2\rangle = |\bar{q}_1 q_2\rangle$$

then, the meson is "G even" (G = +1). On the other hand, if

$$|q_1\bar{q}_2\rangle = -|\bar{q}_1 q_2\rangle$$

then the meson is "G odd" (G = −1).

=== Isospin and charge ===
Combinations of one u, d, or s quark and one u, d, or s antiquark in J^{P} = 0^{−} configuration form a nonet.

Combinations of one u, d, or s quark and one u, d, or s antiquark in J^{P} = 1^{−} configuration also form a nonet.

==== Original isospin model ====
The concept of isospin was first proposed by Werner Heisenberg in 1932 to explain the similarities between protons and neutrons under the strong interaction. Although they had different electric charges, their masses were so similar that physicists believed that they were actually the same particle. The different electric charges were explained as being the result of some unknown excitation similar to spin. This unknown excitation was later dubbed isospin by Eugene Wigner in 1937.

When the first mesons were discovered, they too were seen through the eyes of isospin and so the three pions were believed to be the same particle, but in different isospin states.

The mathematics of isospin was modeled after the mathematics of spin. Isospin projections varied in increments of 1 just like those of spin, and to each projection was associated a "charged state". Because the "pion particle" had three "charged states", it was said to be of isospin I = 1. Its "charged states" π^{+}, π^{0}, and π^{−}, corresponded to the isospin projections I_{3} = +1, I_{3} = 0, and I_{3} = −1 respectively. Another example is the "rho particle", also with three charged states. Its "charged states" ρ^{+}, ρ^{0}, and ρ^{−}, corresponded to the isospin projections I_{3} = +1 , I_{3} = 0 , and I_{3} = −1 respectively.

==== Replacement by the quark model ====
This belief lasted until Murray Gell-Mann proposed the quark model in 1964 (containing originally only the u, d, and s quarks). The success of the isospin model is now understood to be an artifact of the similar masses of the u and d quarks. Because the u and d quarks have similar masses, particles made of the same number of them also have similar masses.

The exact u and d quark composition determines the charge, because u quarks carry charge + 2/3 e whereas d quarks carry charge − 1/3 e. For example, the three pions all have different charges

- π^{+} = (ud̅)
- π^{0} = a quantum superposition of (uu̅) and (dd̅) states
- π^{−} = (du̅)

but they all have similar masses (c. 140 MeV/c^{2}) as they are each composed of a same total number of up and down quarks and antiquarks. Under the isospin model, they were considered a single particle in different charged states.

After the quark model was adopted, physicists noted that the isospin projections were related to the up and down quark content of particles by the relation

$$I_3 = \frac{1}{2}\left[\left(n_\text{u} - n_\bar{\text{u}}\right) - \left(n_\text{d} - n_\bar{\text{d}}\right)\right],$$

where the n-symbols are the count of up and down quarks and antiquarks.

In the "isospin picture", the three pions and three rhos were thought to be the different states of two particles. However, in the quark model, the rhos are excited states of pions. Isospin, although conveying an inaccurate picture of things, is still used to classify hadrons, leading to unnatural and often confusing nomenclature.

Because mesons are hadrons, the isospin classification is also used for them all, with the quantum number calculated by adding I_{3} = +1/2 for each positively charged up-or-down quark-or-antiquark (up quarks and down antiquarks), and I_{3} = −1/2 for each negatively charged up-or-down quark-or-antiquark (up antiquarks and down quarks).

=== Flavour quantum numbers ===
The strangeness quantum number S (not to be confused with spin) was noticed to go up and down along with particle mass. The higher the mass, the lower (more negative) the strangeness (the more s quarks). Particles could be described with isospin projections (related to charge) and strangeness (mass) (see the uds nonet figures). As other quarks were discovered, new quantum numbers were made to have similar description of udc and udb nonets. Because only the u and d mass are similar, this description of particle mass and charge in terms of isospin and flavour quantum numbers only works well for the nonets made of one u, one d and one other quark and breaks down for the other nonets (for example ucb nonet). If the quarks all had the same mass, their behaviour would be called symmetric, because they would all behave in exactly the same way with respect to the strong interaction. However, as quarks do not have the same mass, they do not interact in the same way (exactly like an electron placed in an electric field will accelerate more than a proton placed in the same field because of its lighter mass), and the symmetry is said to be broken.

It was noted that charge (Q) was related to the isospin projection (I_{3}), the baryon number (B) and flavour quantum numbers (S, C, B′, T) by the Gell-Mann–Nishijima formula:

$$Q = I_3 + \frac{1}{2}(B + S + C + B^\prime + T),$$

where S, C, B′, and T represent the strangeness, charm, bottomness and topness flavour quantum numbers respectively. They are related to the number of strange, charm, bottom, and top quarks and antiquark according to the relations:

$$\begin{align}
S &= -(n_\text{s} - n_\bar{\text{s}}) \\
C &= +(n_\text{c} - n_\bar{\text{c}}) \\
B^\prime &= -(n_\text{b} - n_\bar{\text{b}}) \\
T &= +(n_\text{t} - n_\bar{\text{t}}),
\end{align}$$

meaning that the Gell-Mann–Nishijima formula is equivalent to the expression of charge in terms of quark content:

$$Q=\frac{2}{3}[(n_\text{u}-n_\bar{\text{u}})+(n_\text{c}-n_\bar{\text{c}})+(n_\text{t}-n_\bar{\text{t}})]-\frac{1}{3}[(n_\text{d}-n_\bar{\text{d}})+(n_\text{s}-n_\bar{\text{s}})+(n_\text{b}-n_\bar{\text{b}})].$$

== Classification ==
Mesons are classified into groups according to their isospin (I), total angular momentum (J), parity (P), G-parity (G) or C-parity (C) when applicable, and quark (q) content. The rules for classification are defined by the Particle Data Group, and are rather convoluted. The rules are presented below, in table form for simplicity.

=== Types of meson ===
Mesons are classified into types according to their spin configurations. Some specific configurations are given special names based on the mathematical properties of their spin configuration.

Types of mesons
Type	S	L	P	J	J^{P}
Pseudoscalar meson	0	0	−	0	0^{−}
Pseudovector meson	0, 1	1	+	1	1^{+}
Vector meson	1	0, 2	−	1	1^{−}
Scalar meson	1	1	+	0	0^{+}
Tensor meson	1	1, 3	+	2	2^{+}

=== Nomenclature ===
==== Flavourless mesons ====
Flavourless mesons are mesons made of a pair of quark and antiquarks of the same flavour (all their flavour quantum numbers are zero: S = 0, C = 0, B′ = 0, T = 0). (Note: For the purpose of nomenclature, the isospin projection I_{3} is treated as if it were not a flavour quantum number. This means that the charged pion-like mesons (π^{±}, a^{±}, b^{±}, and ρ^{±} mesons) follow the rules of flavourless mesons, even if they aren't truly "flavourless".) The rules for flavourless mesons are:

Nomenclature of flavourless mesons
qq̅ content	I	J^{PC (Note: C-parity is only relevant for neutral mesons.)}			
qq̅ content	I	0^{−+}, 2^{−+}, 4^{−+}, ...	1^{+−}, 3^{+−}, 5^{+−}, ...	1^{−−}, 2^{−−}, 3^{−−}, ...	0^{++}, 1^{++}, 2^{++}, ...
ud̅ $\mathrm{\tfrac{u\bar{u} - d\bar{d}}{\sqrt{2}}}$ du̅	1	π^{+} π^{0} π^{−}	b^{+} b^{0} b^{−}	ρ^{+} ρ^{0} ρ^{−}	a^{+} a^{0} a^{−}
Mix of uu̅, dd̅, ss̅	0	η η′	h h′	ω ϕ	f f′
cc̅	0	η_{c}	h_{c}	ψ (Note: For the special case J^{PC} = 1^{−−}, the ψ is called the J/ψ.)	χ_{c}
bb̅	0	η_{b}	h_{b}	ϒ	χ_{b}
tt̅	0	η_{t}	h_{t}	θ	χ_{t}

In addition

- When the spectroscopic state of the meson is known, it is added in parentheses.
- When the spectroscopic state is unknown, mass (in MeV/c^{2}) is added in parentheses.
- When the meson is in its ground state, nothing is added in parentheses.

==== Flavoured mesons ====
Flavoured mesons are mesons made of pair of quark and antiquarks of different flavours. The rules are simpler in this case: The main symbol depends on the heavier quark, the superscript depends on the charge, and the subscript (if any) depends on the lighter quark. In table form, they are:

Nomenclature of flavoured mesons
Quark	Antiquark					
Quark	up	down	charm	strange	top	bottom
up	—N/a	(Note: For the purpose of nomenclature, the isospin projection I_{3} is treated as if it were not a flavour quantum number. This means that the charged pion-like mesons (π^{±}, a^{±}, b^{±}, and ρ^{±} mesons) follow the rules of flavourless mesons, even if they aren't truly "flavourless".)	D̅^{0}	K^{+}	T̅^{0}	B^{+}
down		—N/a	D^{−}	K^{0}	T^{−}	B^{0}
charm	D^{0}	D^{+}	—N/a	D^{+}_{s}	T̅^{0}_{c}	B^{+}_{c}
strange	K^{−}	K̅^{0}	D^{−}_{s}	—N/a	T^{−}_{s}	B^{0}_{s}
top	T^{0}	T^{+}	T^{0}_{c}	T^{+}_{s}	—N/a	T^{+}_{b}
bottom	B^{−}	B̅^{0}	B^{−}_{c}	B̅^{0}_{s}	T^{−}_{b}	—N/a

In addition

- If J^{P} is in the "normal series" (i.e., J^{P} = 0^{+}, 1^{−}, 2^{+}, 3^{−}, ...), a superscript ∗ is added.
- If the meson is not pseudoscalar (J^{P} = 0^{−}) or vector (J^{P} = 1^{−}), J is added as a subscript.
- When the spectroscopic state of the meson is known, it is added in parentheses.
- When the spectroscopic state is unknown, mass (in MeV/c^{2}) is added in parentheses.
- When the meson is in its ground state, nothing is added in parentheses.

== Exotic mesons ==
There is experimental evidence for particles that are hadrons (i.e., are composed of quarks) and are color-neutral with zero baryon number, and thus by conventional definition are mesons. Yet, these particles do not consist of a single quark/antiquark pair, as all the other conventional mesons discussed above do. A tentative category for these particles is exotic mesons.

There are at least five exotic meson resonances that have been experimentally confirmed to exist by two or more independent experiments. The most statistically significant of these is the Z(4430), discovered by the Belle experiment in 2007 and confirmed by LHCb in 2014. It is a candidate for being a tetraquark: a particle composed of two quarks and two antiquarks. See the main article above for other particle resonances that are candidates for being exotic mesons.

== List ==
The following lists details for all known and predicted pseudoscalar (J^{P} = 0^{−}) and vector (J^{P} = 1^{−}) mesons.

The properties and quark content of the particles are tabulated below; for the corresponding antiparticles, simply change quarks into antiquarks (and vice versa) and flip the sign of Q, B, S, C, and B′. Particles with ^{†} next to their names have been predicted by the Standard Model but not yet observed. Values in red have not been firmly established by experiments, but are predicted by the quark model and are consistent with the measurements.

=== Pseudoscalar mesons ===
Particle name	Particle symbol	Antiparticle symbol	Quark content	Rest mass [MeV/c^{2}]	Charge radii [fm]	I^{G}	J^{PC}	S	C	B′	Mean lifetime [s]	Commonly decays to (>5% of decays)
Pion	π^{+}	π^{−}	ud̅	139.57018±0.00035	0.659 ± 0.004	1^{−}	0^{−}	0	0	0	(2.6033±0.0005)×10^{−8}	μ^{+} + ν_{μ}
Pion	π^{0}	Self	$\mathrm{\tfrac{u\bar{u} - d\bar{d}}{\sqrt{2}}}\,$^{^{[a]}}	134.9766±0.0006		1^{−}	0^{−+}	0	0	0	(8.52±0.18)×10^{−17}	γ + γ
Eta meson	η	Self	$\mathrm{\tfrac{u\bar{u} + d\bar{d} - 2s\bar{s}}{\sqrt{6}}}\,$^{^{[a]}}	547.862±0.018	0.68	0^{+}	0^{−+}	0	0	0	(5.02±0.19)×10^{−19}^{^{[b]}}	γ + γ or π^{0} + π^{0} + π^{0} or π^{+} + π^{0} + π^{−}
Eta prime meson	η′(958)	Self	$\tfrac\mathrm{u\bar{u} + d\bar{d} + s\bar{s}}{\sqrt{3}}\,$^{^{[a]}}	957.78±0.06		0^{+}	0^{−+}	0	0	0	(3.32±0.15)×10^{−21}^{^{[b]}}	π^{+} + π^{−} + η or (ρ^{0} + γ) / (π^{+} + π^{−} + γ) or π^{0} + π^{0} + η
Charmed eta meson	η_{c}(1S)	Self	cc̅	2983.6±0.7	0.2090	0^{+}	0^{−+}	0	0	0	(2.04±0.05)×10^{−23}^{^{[b]}}	See η_{c} decay modes
Bottom eta meson	η_{b}(1S)	Self	bb̅	9398.0±3.2	0.0700	0^{+}	0^{−+}	0	0	0	(6.58±0.15)×10^{−23}^{^{[b]}}	See η_{b} decay modes
Kaon	K^{+}	K^{−}	us̅	493.677±0.016	0.34	1/2	0^{−}	1	0	0	(1.2380±0.0021)×10^{−8}	μ^{+} + ν_{μ} or π^{+} + π^{0} or π^{0} + e^{+} + ν_{e} or π^{+} + π^{+} + π^{−}
Kaon	K^{0}	K̅^{0}	ds̅	497.614±0.024	−0.076	1/2	0^{−}	1	0	0	^{^{[c]}}	^{^{[c]}}
K-Short	K^{0}_{S}	Self	$\mathrm{\tfrac{d\bar{s} - s\bar{d}}{\sqrt{2}}}\,$^{^{[e]}}	497.614±0.024^{^{[d]}}		1/2	0^{−}	(*)	0	0	(8.954±0.004)×10^{−11}	π^{+} + π^{−} or π^{0} + π^{0}
K-Long	K^{0}_{L}	Self	$\mathrm{\tfrac{d\bar{s} + s\bar{d}}{\sqrt{2}}}\,$^{^{[e]}}	497.614±0.024^{^{[d]}}		1/2	0^{−}	(*)	0	0	(5.116±0.021)×10^{−8}	π^{±} + e^{∓} + ν_{e} or π^{±} + μ^{∓} + ν_{μ} or π^{0} + π^{0} + π^{0} or π^{+} + π^{0} + π^{−}
D meson	D^{+}	D^{−}	cd̅	1869.61±0.10	0.260	1/2	0^{−}	0	+1	0	(1.040±0.007)×10^{−12}	See D^{+} decay modes
D meson	D^{0}	D̅^{0}	cu̅	1864.84±0.07	−0.453	1/2	0^{−}	0	+1	0	(4.101±0.015)×10^{−13}	See D^{0} decay modes
Strange D meson	D^{+}_{s}	D^{−}_{s}	cs̅	1968.30±0.11	0.216	0	0^{−}	+1	+1	0	(5.00±0.07)×10^{−13}	See D^{+}_{s} decay modes
B meson	B^{+}	B^{−}	ub̅	5279.26±0.17	0.536	1/2	0^{−}	0	0	+1	(1.638±0.004)×10^{−12}	See B^{+} decay modes
B meson	B^{0}	B̅^{0}	db̅	5279.58±0.17	−0.266	1/2	0^{−}	0	0	+1	(1.519±0.009)×10^{−12}	See B^{0} decay modes
Strange B meson	B^{0}_{s}	B̅^{0}_{s}	sb̅	5366.77±0.24	−0.214	0	0^{−}	−1	0	+1	(1.512±0.007)×10^{−12}	See B^{0}_{s} decay modes
Charmed B meson	B^{+}_{c}	B^{−}_{c}	cb̅	6275.6±1.1		0	0^{−}	0	+1	+1	(4.52±0.33)×10^{−13}	See B^{+}_{c} decay modes

^{[a]} Makeup inexact due to non-zero quark masses.
^{[b]} PDG reports the resonance width (Γ). Here the conversion τ = ħ/Γ is given instead.
^{[c]} Strong eigenstate. No definite lifetime (see kaon notes below)
^{[d]} The mass of the K^{0}_{L} and K^{0}_{S} are given as that of the K^{0}. However, it is known that a difference between the masses of the K^{0}_{L} and K^{0}_{S} on the order of 2.2×10^{−11} MeV/c^{2} exists.
^{[e]} Weak eigenstate. Makeup is missing small CP-violating term (see notes on neutral kaons below).

=== Vector mesons ===
Particle name	Particle symbol	Antiparticle symbol	Quark content	Rest mass [MeV/c^{2}]	I^{G}	J^{PC}	S	C	B′	Mean lifetime [s]	Commonly decays to (>5% of decays)
Charged rho meson	ρ^{+}(770)	ρ^{−}(770)	ud̅	775.11±0.34	1^{+}	1^{−}	0	0	0	(4.41±0.02)×10^{−24}^{^{[f]}^{[g]}}	π^{+} + π^{0}
Neutral rho meson	ρ^{0}(770)	Self	$\mathrm{\tfrac{u\bar{u}-d\bar{d}}{\sqrt 2}}$	775.26±0.25	1^{+}	1^{−−}	0	0	0	(4.45±0.03)×10^{−24}^{^{[f]}^{[g]}}	π^{+} + π^{−}
Omega meson	ω(782)	Self	$\mathrm{\tfrac{u\bar{u}+d\bar{d}}{\sqrt 2}}$	782.65±0.12	0^{−}	1^{−−}	0	0	0	(7.75±0.07)×10^{−23}^{^{[f]}}	π^{+} + π^{0} + π^{−} or π^{0} + γ
Phi meson	ϕ(1020)	Self	ss̅	1019.461±0.019	0^{−}	1^{−−}	0	0	0	(1.54±0.01)×10^{−22}^{^{[f]}}	K^{+} + K^{−} or K^{0}_{S} + K^{0}_{L} or (ρ + π) / (π^{+} + π^{0} + π^{−})
J/psi meson	J/ψ	Self	cc̅	3096.916±0.011	0^{−}	1^{−−}	0	0	0	(7.09±0.21)×10^{−21}^{^{[f]}}	See J/ψ(1S) decay modes
Upsilon meson	ϒ(1S)	Self	bb̅	9460.30±0.26	0^{−}	1^{−−}	0	0	0	(1.22±0.03)×10^{−20}^{^{[f]}}	See ϒ(1S) decay modes
Kaon	K^{∗+}	K^{∗−}	us̅	891.66±0.26	1/2	1^{−}	1	0	0	(3.26±0.06)×10^{−23}^{^{[f]}^{[g]}}	K^{+} + π^{0} or K^{0} + π^{+}
Kaon	K^{∗0}	K̅^{∗0}	ds̅	895.81±0.19	1/2	1^{−}	1	0	0	(1.39±0.02)×10^{−23}^{^{[f]}}	K^{+} + π^{−} or K^{0} + π^{0}
D meson	D^{∗+}(2010)	D^{∗−}(2010)	cd̅	2010.26±0.07	1/2	1^{−}	0	+1	0	(7.89±0.17)×10^{−21}^{^{[f]}}	D^{0} + π^{+} or D^{+} + π^{0}
D meson	D^{∗0}(2007)	D̅^{∗0}(2007)	cu̅	2006.96±0.10	1/2	1^{−}	0	+1	0	>3.1×10^{−22}^{^{[f]}}	D^{0} + π^{0} or D^{0} + γ
Strange D meson	D^{∗+}_{s}	D^{∗−}_{s}	cs̅	2112.1±0.4	0	1^{−}	+1	+1	0	>3.4×10^{−22}^{^{[f]}}	D^{+}_{s} + γ or D^{+}_{s} + π^{0}
B meson	B^{∗+}	B^{∗−}	ub̅	5325.2±0.4	1/2	1^{−}	0	0	+1	Unknown	B^{+} + γ
B meson	B^{∗0}	B̅^{∗0}	db̅	5325.2±0.4	1/2	1^{−}	0	0	+1	Unknown	B^{0} + γ
Strange B meson	B^{∗0}_{s}	B̅^{∗0}_{s}	sb̅	5415.4+2.4 −2.1	0	1^{−}	−1	0	+1	Unknown	B^{0}_{s} + γ
Charmed B meson^{†}	B^{∗+}_{c}	B^{∗−}_{c}	cb̅	Unknown	0	1^{−}	0	+1	+1	Unknown	Unknown

^{[f]} PDG reports the resonance width (Γ). Here the conversion τ = ħ/Γ is given instead.
^{[g]} The exact value depends on the method used. See the given reference for detail.

=== Notes on neutral kaons ===
There are two complications with neutral kaons:

- Due to neutral kaon mixing, the K^{0}_{S} and K^{0}_{L} are not eigenstates of strangeness. However, they are eigenstates of the weak force, which determines how they decay, so these are the particles with definite lifetime.
- The linear combinations given in the table for the K^{0}_{S} and K^{0}_{L} are not exactly correct, since there is a small correction due to CP violation. See CP violation in kaons.

Note that these issues also exist in principle for other neutral flavored mesons; however, the weak eigenstates are considered separate particles only for kaons because of their dramatically different lifetimes.

== See also ==
- Mesonic molecule
- Standard Model
