= Bottom eta meson =

Subatomic particle

Bottom eta meson (η_{b})
- The quark structure of the bottom eta meson. The color assignment of individual quarks is arbitrary, but the net color charge must be zero. Forces between quarks are mediated by gluons.
- Composition: bb̅
- Statistics: Bosonic
- Family: Mesons
- Interactions: Strong, weak, electromagnetic, gravity
- Symbol: η_{b}
- Antiparticle: Self
- Discovered: SLAC (2008)
- Types: 1
- Mass: 9388.9+3.1 −2.3 MeV/c^{2}
- Electric charge: 0 e
- Spin: 0
- Isospin: 0
- Hypercharge: 0
- Parity: -1
- C parity: +1

The bottom eta meson (η_{b}) or eta-b meson is a flavourless meson formed from a bottom quark and its antiparticle. It was first observed by the BaBar experiment at SLAC in 2008, and is the lightest particle containing a bottom and anti-bottom quark.

== See also ==
- Eta and eta prime mesons, a similar particle with light quarks.
- Quarkonium, the general name for mesons formed from a quark and the corresponding antiquark.
- List of mesons
