= J/psi meson =

Subatomic particle made of a charm quark and antiquark

J/psi
- Composition: cc̅
- Statistics: bosonic
- Family: meson
- Interactions: strong, weak, electromagnetic, gravity
- Symbol: J/ψ
- Antiparticle: self
- Discovered: SLAC: Burton Richter et al. (1974); BNL: Samuel Ting et al. (1974)
- Types: 1
- Mass: 5.5208×10^{−27} kg 3.096916 GeV/c^{2}
- Decay width: 92.9 keV
- Decays into: 3g or γ+2g or γ
- Electric charge: 0 e
- Spin: 1 ħ
- Isospin: 0
- Hypercharge: 0
- Parity: −1
- C parity: −1

The J/ψ (J/psi) meson /ˈdʒeɪ ˈsaɪ ˈmiːzɒn/ is a subatomic particle, a flavor-neutral meson consisting of a charm quark and a charm antiquark. Mesons formed by a bound state of a charm quark and a charm antiquark are generally known as "charmonium" or psions. The J/ψ is the most common form of charmonium, due to its spin of 1 and its low rest mass. The J/ψ has a rest mass of 3.0969 GeV/c^{2}, just above that of the η_{c} (2.9836 GeV/c^{2}), and a mean lifetime of 7.2×10^{−21} s. This lifetime was about a thousand times longer than expected.

Its discovery was made independently by two research groups, one at the Stanford Linear Accelerator Center, headed by Burton Richter, and one at the Brookhaven National Laboratory, headed by Samuel Ting of MIT. They discovered that they had found the same particle, and both announced their discoveries on 11 November 1974. The importance of this discovery is highlighted by the fact that the subsequent, rapid changes in high-energy physics at the time have become collectively known as the "November Revolution." Richter and Ting were awarded the 1976 Nobel Prize in Physics.

== Background to discovery ==
The background to the discovery of the J/ψ was both theoretical and experimental. In the 1960s, the first quark models of elementary particle physics were proposed, which said that protons, neutrons, and all other baryons, and also all mesons, are made from fractionally charged particles, the "quarks", originally with three types or "flavors", called up, down, and strange. (Later the model was expanded to six quarks, adding the charm, top and bottom quarks.) Despite the ability of quark models to bring order to the "elementary particle zoo", they were considered something like mathematical fiction at the time, a simple artifact of deeper physical reasons.

Starting in 1969, deep inelastic scattering experiments at SLAC revealed surprising experimental evidence for particles inside of protons. Whether these were quarks or something else was not known at first. Many experiments were needed to fully identify the properties of the sub-protonic components. To a first approximation, they indeed were a match for the previously described quarks.

On the theoretical front, gauge theories with broken symmetry became the first fully viable contenders for explaining the weak interaction after Gerard 't Hooft discovered in 1971 how to calculate with them beyond tree level. The first experimental evidence for these electroweak unification theories was the discovery of the weak neutral current in 1973. Gauge theories with quarks became a viable contender for the strong interaction in 1973, when the concept of asymptotic freedom was identified.

However, a naive mixture of electroweak theory and the quark model led to calculations about known decay modes that contradicted observation: In particular, it predicted Z boson-mediated flavor-changing decays of a strange quark into a down quark, which were not observed. A 1970 idea of Sheldon Glashow, John Iliopoulos, and Luciano Maiani, known as the GIM mechanism, showed that the flavor-changing decays would be strongly suppressed if there were a fourth quark (now called the charm quark) that was a complementary counterpart to the strange quark. By summer 1974 this work had led to theoretical predictions of what a charm + anticharm meson would be like. The group at Brookhaven, (Note: Glenn Everhart, Terry Rhoades, Min Chen, and Ulrich Becker, at Brookhaven first to discerned the 3.1 GeV peak in pair-production rates.) were the first to discern a peak at 3.1 GeV in plots of production rates. Ting named it the "J meson".

== Theoretical interpretation ==
While the "November Revolution" of 1974 provided the experimental data for the discovery, the interpretation of the J/Psi particle as a charmonium state was established by a handful of papers that appeared between late 1974 and early 1975, linking the experimental discovery directly to the so called GIM mechanism (1970) and the charm quark. Indeed, the GIM Mechanism written a few years before the discovery, gave the theoretical foundation for the existence of the fourth quark (charm), to explain why certain particle decays were suppressed. Then the following theoretical works provided the correct physical interpretation of the J/Psi particle as a bound state of the charm- anti-charm quarks.

Chronologically, the first immediate interpretation came from C. Dominguez and M. Greco. They used Duality Sum Rules and the Extended Vector Dominance Model (EVDM) and proved that the J/Psi (and Psi’) properties were consistent with a quark of charge +2/3. This linked the experimental discovery directly to the GIM mechanism and the charm quark, providing a dynamic explanation of the production cross-section in e+e- collisions.

T. Appelquist and H.D. Politzer coined the term "Charmonium" and applied the Asymptotic Freedom of Quantum Chromodynamics (QCD) to explain why this (c-cbar) state didn't decay instantly. Indeed while the J/Psi was quite massive, it was incredibly "narrow" (long-lived). These authors explained why this (c-cbar) state did not decay instantly, by arguing that because the charm quark is heavy, the pair is at very short distances where the strong force is weak. Then the decay into lighter hadrons is "OZI suppressed," requiring the exchange of at least three gluons, which explains the particle's longevity.

A. De Rújula and S.L. Glashow immediately identified the J/Psi as the ground state of the constituent charm quarks of the GIM Mechanism, classified within an SU(4) symmetry framework. Then once the ground state was found, the authors showed it was part of a larger family of particles, and successfully calculated the mass relations between the J/Psi and other hadrons of the charm spectroscopy.

== Decay modes ==
Hadronic decay modes of J/ψ are strongly suppressed because of the OZI rule. This effect strongly increases the lifetime of the particle and thereby gives it its very narrow decay width of just 93.2±2.1 keV. Because of this strong suppression, electromagnetic decays begin to compete with hadronic decays. This is why the J/ψ has a significant branching fraction to leptons.

The primary decay modes are:

cc̅ → 3 g		64.1%±1.0%
cc̅ → γ + 2 g		8.8%±1.1%
cc̅ → γ		~25.5%
	γ → hadrons	13.5%±0.3%
	γ → e^{+} + e^{−}	5.971%±0.032%
	γ → μ^{+} + μ^{−}	5.961%±0.033%

== J/psi melting ==
In a hot QCD medium, when the temperature is raised well beyond the Hagedorn temperature, the J/ψ and its excitations are expected to melt. This is one of the predicted signals of the formation of the quark–gluon plasma. Heavy-ion experiments at CERN's Super Proton Synchrotron and at BNL's Relativistic Heavy Ion Collider have studied this phenomenon without a conclusive outcome as of 2009. This is due to the requirement that the disappearance of J/ψ mesons is evaluated with respect to the baseline provided by the total production of all charm quark-containing subatomic particles, and because it is widely expected that some J/ψ are produced and/or destroyed at time of QGP hadronization. Thus, there is uncertainty in the prevailing conditions at the initial collisions.

In fact, instead of suppression, enhanced production of J/ψ is expected in heavy ion experiments at LHC where the quark-combinant production mechanism should be dominant given the large abundance of charm quarks in the QGP. Aside of J/ψ, charmed B mesons (B_{c}), offer a signature that indicates that quarks move freely and bind at-will when combining to form hadrons.

== Name ==
Because of the nearly simultaneous discovery, the J/ψ is the only particle to have a two-letter name. Richter named it "SP", after the SPEAR accelerator used at SLAC; however, none of his coworkers liked that name. After consulting with Greek-born Leo Resvanis to see which Greek letters were still available, and rejecting "iota" because its name implies insignificance, Richter chose "psi" – a name which, as Gerson Goldhaber pointed out, contains the original name "SP", but in reverse order. Coincidentally, later spark chamber pictures often resembled the psi shape. Ting assigned the name "J" to it, saying that the more stable particles, such as the W and Z bosons had Roman names, as opposed to classical particles, which had Greek names. He also cited the symbol for electromagnetic current $j_{\mu}(x)$ which much of their previous work was concentrated on to be one of the reasons.

Much of the scientific community considered it unjust to give one of the two discoverers priority, so most subsequent publications have referred to the particle as the "J/ψ".

The first excited state of the J/ψ was called the ψ′; it is now called the ψ(2S), indicating its quantum state. The next excited state was called the ψ″; it is now called ψ(3770), indicating mass in MeV/c^{2}. Other vector charm–anticharm states are denoted similarly with ψ and the quantum state (if known) or the mass. The "J" is not used, since Richter's group alone first found excited states.

The name charmonium is used for the J/ψ and other charm–anticharm bound states. (Note: There are two different regimes of flavorless, neutral mesons: Low mass and high mass. Lighter mesons, such as the neutral pion ( π^{0}, the lightest of all mesons), the η and η′, ρ^{0}, ω^{0}, and so-on. Whether high or low mass, since all of the flavorless mesons' quantum numbers are zero they can only be distinguished by their masses. Generally their quark content is invisible, especially the low-mass flavorless mesons, not only because their very similar small masses can be easily confused, but also because the low-mass particles themselves do actually exist as mixtures. For example the lowest mass of all mesons is the neutral pion; it is approximately an equal mix of dd̅ and uu̅ matching quark–antiquark pairs. However, the heavy c and b quarks are sufficiently distinct in mass to tell them apart: cc̅ = "charmonium" = J/ψ meson; bb̅ = "bottomonium" = ϒ^{0}) This is by analogy with positronium, which also consists of a particle and its antiparticle (an electron and positron in the case of positronium).

== See also ==
- List of multiple discoveries
