= Theta meson =

Hypothetical form of quarkonium

- Quark structure of the theta meson
- Composition: tt̅
- Statistics: bosonic
- Interactions: strong, weak, gravitational, electromagnetic
- Status: hypothetical
- Antiparticle: self
- Electric charge: 0 e
- Isospin: 0
- Hypercharge: 0
- Parity: −1
- C parity: −1

The theta meson (θ) is a hypothetical form of quarkonium (i.e. a flavourless meson) formed by a top quark (t) and top antiquark (t̅). As a P-odd and C-odd tt̅ state, it is analogous to the ϕ (ss̅), J/ψ (cc̅) and ϒ (bb̅) mesons. Due to the top quark's short lifetime, the theta meson is expected to not be observed in nature.

In 2025, new research from the CMS and ATLAS collaborations unexpectedly demonstrated the existence of a tt̅ meson at greater than 5-sigma significance, but that is believed to be the pseudoscalar η_{t} meson rather than the θ meson.

== See also ==
- List of mesons
