= Delta baryon =

Family of subatomic particles

- Composition: Δ^{++}: uuu; Δ^{+}: uud; Δ^{0}: udd; Δ^{−}: ddd
- Statistics: Fermionic
- Interactions: Strong, weak, electromagnetic, and gravity
- Symbol: Δ
- Types: 4
- Mass: 1232±2 MeV/c^{2}
- Spin: 3 /2, 5 /2, 7 /2 ...
- Strangeness: 0
- Charm: 0
- Bottomness: 0
- Topness: 0
- Isospin: 3 /2

The Delta baryons (or Δ baryons, also called Delta resonances) are a family of subatomic particle made of three up and/or down quarks, the same constituent quarks that make up the more familiar protons and neutrons.

== Properties ==
Four closely related Δ baryons exist: Δ^{++} (constituent quarks: uuu), Δ^{+} (uud), Δ^{0} (udd), and Δ^{−} (ddd), which respectively carry an electric charge of +2 e, +1 e, 0 e, and −1 e.

The Δ baryons have a mass of about 1232 MeV/c^{2}; their third component of isospin $\; I_3 = \pm\tfrac{1}{2} ~\mathsf{ or }~ \pm\tfrac{3}{2}\;;$ and they are required to have an intrinsic spin of 3 /2 or higher (half-integer units). Ordinary nucleons (symbol N, meaning either a proton or neutron), by contrast, have a mass of about 939 MeV/c^{2}, and both intrinsic spin and isospin of 1/ 2 . The Δ^{+} (uud) and Δ^{0} (udd) particles are higher-mass spin-excitations of the proton (N^{+}, uud) and neutron (N^{0}, udd), respectively. The Δ^{++} and Δ^{−}, however, have no direct nucleon analogues: For example, even though their charges are identical and their masses are similar, the Δ^{−} (ddd), is not closely related to the antiproton (p̅, u̅u̅d̅).

The Delta states discussed here are only the lowest-mass quantum excitations of the proton and neutron. At higher spins, additional higher mass Delta states appear, all defined by having constant 3 /2 or 1 /2 isospin (depending on charge), but with spin 3 /2, 5 /2, 7 /2, ..., 11 /2 multiplied by ħ. A complete listing of all properties of all these states can be found in Beringer et al. (2013).

There also exist antiparticle Delta states with opposite charges, made up of the corresponding antiquarks.

== Discovery ==
The states were established experimentally at the University of Chicago cyclotron and the Carnegie Institute of Technology synchro-cyclotron in the mid-1950s using accelerated positive pions on hydrogen targets. The existence of the Δ^{++}, with its unusual electric charge of +2 e, was a crucial clue in the development of the quark model.

== Formation and decay ==
The Delta states are created when a sufficiently energetic probe – such as a photon, electron, neutrino, or pion – impinges upon a proton or neutron, or possibly by the collision of a sufficiently energetic nucleon pair.

All of the Δ baryons with mass near 1232 MeV quickly decay via the strong interaction into a nucleon (proton or neutron) and a pion of appropriate charge. The relative probabilities of allowed final charge states are given by their respective isospin couplings. More rarely, the Δ^{+} can decay into a proton and a photon and the Δ^{0} can decay into a neutron and a photon.

== List ==
Delta baryons
Particle name	Symbol	Quark content	Mass (MeV/c^{2})	I_{3}	J^{P}	Q (e)	S	C	B′	T	Mean lifetime (s)	Commonly decays to
Delta	Δ^{++}(1 232)	uuu	1232±2	+ 3 /2	3 /2^{+}	+2	0	0	0	0	(5.63±0.14)×10^{−24}^{^{[a]}}	p^{+} + π^{+}
Delta	Δ^{+}(1 232)	uud	1232±2	+1/ 2	3 /2^{+}	+1	0	0	0	0	(5.63±0.14)×10^{−24}^{^{[a]}}	π^{+} + n^{0}, or π^{0} + p^{+}
Delta	Δ^{0}(1 232)	udd	1232±2	− 1/ 2	3 /2^{+}	0	0	0	0	0	(5.63±0.14)×10^{−24}^{^{[a]}}	π^{0} + n^{0}, or π^{−} + p^{+}
Delta	Δ^{−}(1 232)	ddd	1232±2	− 3 /2	3 /2^{+}	−1	0	0	0	0	(5.63±0.14)×10^{−24}^{^{[a]}}	π^{−} + n^{0}

^{[a]} PDG reports the resonance width (Γ). Here the conversion $\tau = \frac{\hbar}{\Gamma}$ is given instead.
