= Roper resonance =

The Roper resonance, also known as P_{11}(1440) or N(1440)1/2^{+}, is an unstable nucleon resonance with a mass of about 1,440 MeV/c^{2} and with a relatively wide full Breit-Wigner width Γ ≈ 300 MeV/c^{2}. It contains three quarks (up (u) or down (d)) with total spin J = 1/2 and total isospin I = 1/2. In the quark model it is considered to be a radially excited three-quark state with radial quantum number N = 2 and positive parity. The Roper Resonance has been a subject of many studies because its mass is actually lower than three-quark states with radial quantum number N = 1. Only in the late 2000s was the lower-than-expected mass explained by theoretical calculations, revealing a quark core shielded by a dense cloud of mesons.

== Discovery ==
The Roper resonance was discovered in 1963 by a computer fit of particle-scattering theory to large amounts of pion-nucleon scattering data. The analysis was done on computers at Lawrence Livermore National Laboratory for Ph.D. thesis work of L. David Roper at Massachusetts Institute of Technology under the direction of Bernard Taub Feld at MIT and Michael J. Moravcsik at LLNL. The computer code was developed by Richard Allen Arndt and Robert M. Wright.

== Decay ==
Because of the relatively large full width, which according to uncertainty principle means a shorter lifetime, the Roper resonance decays into a system consisting of other hadrons with sum of the masses less than the mass of the original state. The Roper resonance decays most of the time via the strong force into an ordinary nucleon plus a pion, nucleon plus two pions, or Δ plus a pion.

== Composition ==
Particle	Symbol	Makeup	Average PDG mass MeV/c^{2}	S	C	B	Full width MeV/c^{2}	Decays to
P_{11}(1440)	P_{11}^{+}	uud	1440	0	0	0	200-450	See Particle Data Booklet
P_{11}(1440)	P_{11}^{0}	udd	1440	0	0	0	200-450	See Particle Data Booklet

== See also ==
- List of baryons
- particle physics
- quark model
