= Eta and eta prime mesons =

Isosinglet meson made of quarks and antiquarks

- Composition: η : ≈ $\frac{1}{\sqrt{6}}\left(\mathrm{u\bar{u} + d\bar{d} - 2s\bar{s}}\right)$; η′ : ≈ $\frac{1}{\sqrt{3}}\left(\mathrm{u\bar{u} + d\bar{d} + s\bar{s}}\right)$
- Statistics: Bosonic
- Family: Mesons
- Interactions: Strong, weak, gravitational, electromagnetic
- Symbol: η, η′
- Antiparticle: Self
- Discovered: Aihud Pevsner et al. (1961)
- Types: 2
- Mass: η : 547.862±0.018 MeV/c^{2} η′ : 957.78±0.06 MeV/c^{2}
- Mean lifetime: η: (5.0±0.3)×10^{−19} s, η′: (3.2±0.2)×10^{−21} s
- Decays into: η : γ + γ or π^{0} + π^{0} + π^{0} or π^{+} + π^{0} + π^{−} η′ : π^{+} + π^{−} + η or (ρ^{0} + γ) / (π^{+} + π^{−} + γ) or π^{0} + π^{0} + γ
- Electric charge: 0 e
- Spin: 0 ħ
- Isospin: 0
- Hypercharge: 0
- Parity: −1
- C parity: +1

The eta (η) and eta prime meson (η′) are isosinglet mesons made of a mixture of up, down and strange quarks and their antiquarks. The charmed eta meson (η_{c}) and bottom eta meson (η_{b}) are similar forms of quarkonium; they have the same spin and parity as the (light) η defined, but are made of charm quarks and bottom quarks respectively. The top quark is too heavy to form a similar meson, due to its very fast decay.

== General ==
The eta was discovered in pion–nucleon collisions at the Bevatron in 1961 by Aihud Pevsner et al. at a time when the proposal of the eightfold way was leading to predictions and discoveries of new particles from symmetry considerations.

The difference between the mass of the η and that of the η′ is larger than the quark model can naturally explain. This "η–η′ puzzle" can be resolved by the 't Hooft instanton mechanism (proposed by Gerard 't Hooft in 1976), whose 1/ N realization is also known as the Witten–Veneziano mechanism. The mechanism is named after Edward Witten and Gabriele Veneziano who published independently in 1979. Specifically, in QCD, the higher mass of the η′ is very significant, since it is associated with the axial U_{A}(1) classical symmetry, which is explicitly broken through the chiral anomaly upon quantization; thus, although the "protected" η mass is small, the η′ is not.

== Quark composition ==
The η particles belong to the "pseudo-scalar" nonet of mesons which have spin J = 0 and negative parity, and η and η′ have zero total isospin, I, and zero strangeness, and hypercharge. Each quark which appears in an η particle is accompanied by its antiquark, hence all the main quantum numbers are zero, and the particle overall is "flavourless".

The basic SU(3) symmetry theory of quarks for the three lightest quarks, which takes into account only the strong force, predicts corresponding particles

$$\mathrm{\eta}_1 = \frac{1}{\sqrt 3} \left( \mathrm{ u\bar{u} + d\bar{d} + s\bar{s} } \right) ~,$$

and

$$\mathrm{\eta}_8 = \frac{1}{\sqrt 6} \left( \mathrm{ u\bar{u} + d\bar{d} - 2s\bar{s} } \right) ~.$$

The subscripts are labels that refer to the fact that η_{1} belongs to a singlet (which is fully antisymmetrical) and η_{8} is part of an octet. However, the electroweak interaction – which can transform one flavour of quark into another – causes a small but significant amount of "mixing" of the eigenstates (with mixing angle θ_{P} = −11.5°), so that the actual quark composition is a linear combination of these formulae. That is:

$$\left(\begin{array}{cc}
\cos\theta_\mathrm{P} & - \sin\theta_\mathrm{P} \\
\sin\theta_\mathrm{P} & ~~\cos\theta_\mathrm{P}
\end{array}\right) \left(\begin{array}{c} \mathrm{\eta}_8 \\
\mathrm{\eta}_1 \end{array}\right) =
\left(\begin{array}{c} \mathrm{\eta} \\ \mathrm{\eta'} \end{array}\right) ~.$$

The unsubscripted name η refers to the real particle which is actually observed and which is close to the η_{8}. The η′ is the observed particle close to η_{1}.

The η and η′ particles are closely related to the better-known neutral pion π^{0}, where

$$\mathrm{\pi}^0 = \frac{1}{\sqrt 2} \left( \mathrm{ u\bar{u} - d\bar{d} } \right) ~.$$

In fact, π^{0}, η_{1}, and η_{8} are three mutually orthogonal, linear combinations of the quark pairs uu̅, dd̅, and ss̅; they are at the centre of the pseudo-scalar nonet of mesons with all the main quantum numbers equal to zero.

== η′ meson ==
The eta prime meson (η′) is a flavor SU(3) singlet, unlike the η. It is a different superposition of the same quarks as the eta meson (η), as described above, and it has a higher mass, a different decay state, and a shorter lifetime.

Fundamentally, it results from the direct sum decomposition of the approximate SU(3) flavor symmetry among the three lightest quarks, 3 × 3̅ = 1 + 8, where 1 corresponds to η_{1} before slight quark mixing yields η′.

== See also ==
- Bottom eta meson
- Charmed eta meson
- List of mesons
- Quarkonium
- Special unitary group
