= B-tagging =

b-tagging is a method of jet flavor tagging used in modern particle physics experiments. It is the identification (or "tagging") of jets originating from bottom quarks (or b quarks, hence the name).

== Importance ==
b-tagging is important because:

- The physics of bottom quarks is quite interesting; in particular, it sheds light on CP violation.
- Some important high-mass particles (both recently discovered and hypothetical) decay into bottom quarks. Top quarks very nearly always do so, and the Higgs boson is expected to decay into bottom quarks more than any other particle given its mass has been observed to be about 125 GeV. Identifying bottom quarks helps to identify the decays of these particles.

== Methods ==
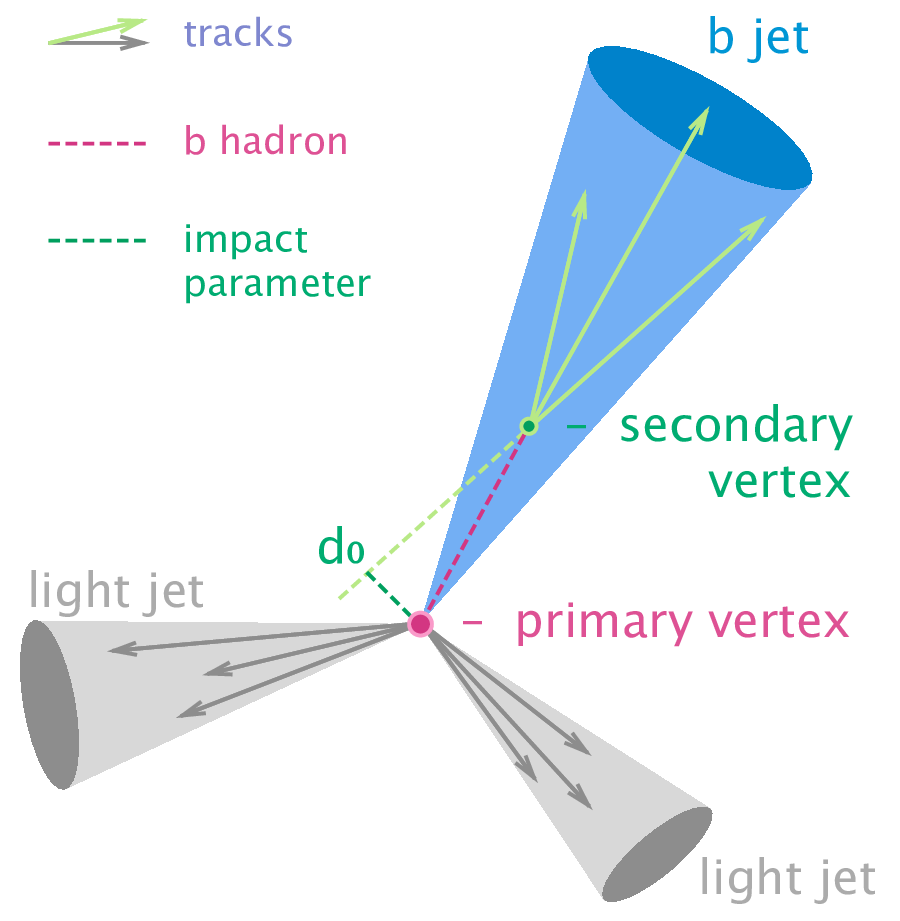
Diagram showing the common principle of identification of jets initiated by b-hadron decays

The methods for b-tagging are based on the unique features of b-jets. These include:

- Hadrons containing bottom quarks have sufficient lifetime that they travel some distance before decaying. On the other hand, their lifetimes are not so high as those of light quark hadrons, so they decay inside the detector rather than escape. The advent of precision silicon detectors within particle detectors has made it possible to identify particles that originate from a place different to where the bottom quark was formed (e.g. the beam–beam collision point in a particle accelerator), and thus indicating the likely presence of a b-jet.
- The bottom quark is much more massive than anything it decays into. Thus its decay products tend to have higher transverse momentum (momentum perpendicular to the original direction of the bottom quark, and therefore of the b-jet). This causes b-jets to be wider, have higher multiplicities (numbers of constituent particles) and invariant masses, and also to contain low-energy leptons with momentum perpendicular to the jet. These two features can be measured, and jets that have them are more likely to be b-jets.
- Opposite-side algorithms have been used at the LHCb to tag the flavor in pairs of b quarks using the decay products of B-hadrons to infer the flavor of B-mesons.

None of the methods of identifying b-jets are foolproof, and modern particle physics experiments must devote significant time to studying how often they successfully identify b-jets and how often they misidentify other jets. Monte Carlo simulations are used to develop and evaluate the performance of tagging algorithms.

Experiments making precise measurements of B mesons (mesons containing b-quarks) also try to identify the particular initial B meson within the jet. This is done in order to observe the oscillation of one meson into another (B^{0}–B̅^{0} oscillation), which allows the measurement of CP violation.

== See also ==
- B-Factory
- K^{0}–K̅^{0} oscillation
