= Kaon =

Quantum particle

- Composition: K^{+}: us̅ K^{0}: ds̅ K̅^{0}: sd̅ K^{−}: su̅
- Statistics: Bosonic
- Family: Mesons
- Interactions: Strong, weak, electromagnetic, gravitational
- Symbol: K^{+}, K^{0}, K̅^{0}, K^{−}
- Antiparticle: K^{+}: K^{−} K^{0}: K̅^{0} K̅^{0}: K^{0} K^{−}: K^{+}
- Discovered: 1947 (Clifford Butler and George Rochester at Department of Physics and Astronomy, University of Manchester)
- Types: 4
- Mass: K^{±}: 493.677±0.016 MeV/c^{2} K^{0}, K̅^{0}: 497.611±0.013 MeV/c^{2}
- Mean lifetime: K^{±}: (1.2380±0.0020)×10^{−8} s K_{S}: (8.954±0.004)×10^{−11} s K_{L}: (5.116±0.021)×10^{−8} s
- Electric charge: K^{±}: ±1 e K^{0}, K̅^{0}: 0 e
- Spin: 0 ħ
- Strangeness: K^{+}, K^{0}: +1; K^{−}, K̅^{0}: −1
- Isospin: K^{+}, K̅^{0}: +1/2; K^{−}, K^{0}: −1/2
- Parity: −1

In particle physics, a kaon, also called a K meson and denoted K, (Note: Until the 1960s the positively charged kaon was formerly called τ^{+} or θ^{+}, as it was believed to be two different particles. See the § Parity violation.) is any of a group of four mesons distinguished by a quantum number called strangeness. In the quark model they are understood to be bound states of a strange quark (or antiquark) and an up or down antiquark (or quark).

Kaons have proved to be a copious source of information on the nature of fundamental interactions since their discovery by George Rochester and Clifford Butler at the Department of Physics and Astronomy, University of Manchester in cosmic rays in 1947. They were essential in establishing the foundations of the Standard Model of particle physics, such as the quark model of hadrons and the theory of quark mixing (the latter was acknowledged by a Nobel Prize in Physics in 2008). Kaons have played a distinguished role in understanding of fundamental conservation laws. Charge conjugation parity (CP) symmetry violation, a requirement in any theory to explain the observed matter–antimatter asymmetry of the universe, was discovered in the kaon system in 1964 (which was acknowledged by a Nobel Prize in 1980). Moreover, direct CP violation was discovered in the kaon decays in the early 2000s by the NA48 experiment at CERN and the KTeV experiment at Fermilab.

== Basic properties ==
The decay of a kaon (K^{+}) into three pions (2 π^{+}, 1 π^{−}) is a process that involves both weak and strong interactions.Weak interactions: The strange antiquark (s̅) of the kaon transmutes into an up antiquark (u̅) by the emission of a W^{+} boson; the W^{+} boson subsequently decays into a down antiquark (d̅) and an up quark (u). Strong interactions: An up quark (u) emits a gluon (g), which decays into a down quark (d) and a down antiquark (d̅).

The four kaons are:

1. K^{−}, negatively charged (containing a strange quark and an up antiquark) has mass 493.677±0.013 MeV/c^{2} and mean lifetime (1.2380±0.0020)×10^{−8} s.
2. K^{+} (antiparticle of above) positively charged (containing an up quark and a strange antiquark) must (by CPT invariance) have mass and lifetime equal to that of K^{−}. Experimentally, the mass difference is 0.032±0.090 MeV/c^{2}, consistent with zero; the difference in lifetimes is (0.11±0.09)×10^{−8} s, also consistent with zero.
3. K^{0}, neutrally charged (containing a down quark and a strange antiquark) has mass 497.648±0.022 MeV/c^{2}. It has mean squared charge radius of −0.076±0.01 fm^{2}.
4. K̅^{0}, neutrally charged (antiparticle of above) (containing a strange quark and a down antiquark) has the same mass.

As the quark model shows, assignments that the kaons form two doublets of isospin; that is, they belong to the fundamental representation of SU(2) called the 2. One doublet of strangeness +1 contains the K^{+} and the K^{0}. The antiparticles form the other doublet (of strangeness −1).

Properties of kaons
Particle name	Particle symbol	Antiparticle symbol	Quark content	Rest mass [MeV/c^{2}]	I^{G}	J^{PC}	S	C	B′	Mean lifetime [s]	Commonly decays to (> 5% of decays)
Kaon	K^{+}	K^{−}	us̅	493.677±0.016	1/2	0^{−}	1	0	0	(1.2380±0.0020)×10^{−8}	μ^{+} + ν_{μ} or π^{+} + π^{0} or π^{+} + π^{+} + π^{−} or π^{0} + e^{+} + ν_{e}
Kaon	K^{0}	K̅^{0}	ds̅	497.611±0.013	1/2	0^{−}	1	0	0	^{^{[§]}}	^{^{[§]}}
K-short	K^{0}_{S}	self	$\mathrm{\tfrac{d\bar{s} + s\bar{d}}{\sqrt{2}}}\,$^{^{[†]}}	497.611±0.013^{^{[‡]}}	1/2	0^{−}	^{[*]}	0	0	(8.954±0.004)×10^{−11}	π^{+} + π^{−} or π^{0} + π^{0}
K-long	K^{0}_{L}	self	$\mathrm{\tfrac{d\bar{s} - s\bar{d}}{\sqrt{2}}}\,$^{^{[†]}}	497.611±0.013^{^{[‡]}}	1/2	0^{−}	^{[*]}	0	0	(5.116±0.021)×10^{−8}	π^{±} + e^{∓} + ν_{e} or π^{±} + μ^{∓} + ν_{μ} or π^{0} + π^{0} + π^{0} or π^{+} + π^{0} + π^{−}

Quark structure of the kaon (K^{+}).

^{[*]} See Notes on neutral kaons in the article List of mesons, and neutral kaon mixing, below.
^{[§]}Strong eigenstate. No definite lifetime (see neutral kaon mixing).
^{[†]}Weak eigenstate. Makeup is missing small CP–violating term (see neutral kaon mixing).
^{[‡]}The mass of the K^{0}_{L} and K^{0}_{S} are given as that of the K^{0}. However, it is known that a relatively minute difference between the masses of the K^{0}_{L} and K^{0}_{S} on the order of 3.5×10^{−6} eV/c^{2} exists.

Although the K^{0} and its antiparticle K̅^{0} are usually produced via the strong force, they decay weakly. Thus, once created the two are better thought of as superpositions of two weak eigenstates that have vastly different lifetimes:

- The long-lived neutral kaon is called the K_{L} ("K-long"), decays primarily into three pions, and has a mean lifetime of 5.18×10^{−8} s.
- The short-lived neutral kaon is called the K_{S} ("K-short"), decays primarily into two pions, and has a mean lifetime 8.958×10^{−11} s.
  Quark structure of the antikaon (K^{−}).

(See discussion of neutral kaon mixing below.)

An experimental observation made in 1964 that K-longs rarely decay into two pions was the discovery of CP violation (see below).

Main decay modes for K^{+}:

Quark structure of the neutral kaon (K^{0}).

Results	Mode	Branching ratio
μ^{+} ν_{μ}	leptonic	63.55±0.11%
π^{+} π^{0}	hadronic	20.66±0.08%
π^{+} π^{+} π^{−}	hadronic	5.59±0.04%
π^{+} π^{0} π^{0}	hadronic	1.761±0.022%
π^{0} e^{+} ν_{e}	semileptonic	5.07±0.04%
π^{0} μ^{+} ν_{μ}	semileptonic	3.353±0.034%

Decay modes for the K^{−} are charge conjugates of the ones above.

== Parity violation ==
Two different decays were found for charged strange mesons into pions:

Decay	θ^{+}	→	π^{+}	+	π^{0}
Parity	+1	=	−1	×	−1
Decay	τ^{+}	→	π^{+}	+	π^{+}	+	π^{−}
Parity	−1	=	−1	×	−1	×	−1

The intrinsic parity of the pion is P = −1 (since the pion is a bound state of a quark and an antiquark, which have opposite parities, with zero angular momentum), and parity is a multiplicative quantum number. Therefore, assuming the parent particle has zero spin, the two-pion and the three-pion final states have different parities (P = +1 and P = −1, respectively). It was thought that the initial states should also have different parities, and hence be two distinct particles. However, with increasingly precise measurements, no difference was found between the masses and lifetimes of each, respectively, indicating that they are the same particle. This was known as the Theta-Tau puzzle (also written θ − τ puzzle, or with the particle reversed). It was resolved only by the discovery of parity violation in the weak interaction (most significantly, by the Wu experiment). Since the mesons decay through weak interactions, parity is not conserved, and the two decays are actually decays of the same particle, now called the K^{+}.

== History ==
The discovery of hadrons with the internal quantum number "strangeness" marks the beginning of a most exciting epoch in particle physics that even now, fifty years later, has not yet found its conclusion ... by and large experiments have driven the development, and that major discoveries came unexpectedly or even against expectations expressed by theorists. — Bigi & Sanda (2016)

While looking for the hypothetical nuclear meson, Louis Leprince-Ringuet found evidence for the existence of a positively charged heavier particle in 1944.

In 1947, G.D. Rochester and C.C. Butler of the University of Manchester published two cloud chamber photographs of cosmic ray-induced events, one showing what appeared to be a neutral particle decaying into two charged pions, and one that appeared to be a charged particle decaying into a charged pion and something neutral. The estimated mass of the new particles was very rough, about half a proton's mass. More examples of these V-particles were slow in coming.

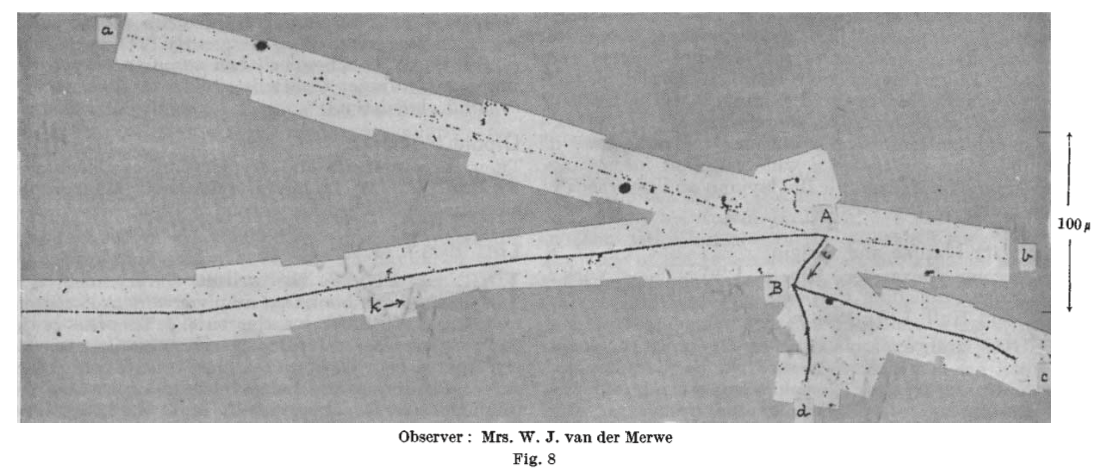
The plate showing the three-pion decay mode of a kaon which enters from the left as track k and decays at point A.

In 1949, Rosemary Brown (later Rosemary Fowler), a research student of Cecil Powell of the University of Bristol, spotted the track k made by a particle of very similar mass that decayed to three pions.

I knew at once that it was new and would be very important. We were seeing things that hadn't been seen before – that's what research in particle physics was. It was very exciting. — Fowler (2024)

This led to the so-called tau–theta puzzle: what seemed to be the same particle (now called K^{+}) decayed in two different modes, Θ to two pions (parity +1), τ to three pions (parity −1). The solution to this puzzle turned out to be that weak interactions do not conserve parity.

The first breakthrough was obtained at Caltech, where a cloud chamber was taken up Mount Wilson, for greater cosmic ray exposure. In 1950, 30 charged and 4 neutral V-particles were reported. Inspired by this, numerous mountaintop observations were made over the next several years and by 1954 the following terminology was being used: L-meson for a particle of mass up to a pion, for the then-called π-meson and μ-meson, and K-meson for a particle of mass between the pion and proton, for the tentative τ^{±} (now decay mode Γ_{11} of K^{±}), κ (Γ_{4}), χ (Γ_{9}), and θ⁰ (turned lowercase as capitals were reserved for baryons, Γ_{8} and Γ_{2} of K^{0}_{L}). Leprince-Ringuet coined the still-used term hyperon to mean any particle heavier than a nucleon. The Leprince-Ringuet particle turned out to be the K^{+} meson.

The decays were extremely long: typical lifetimes are of the order of 10^{−10} s. However, pion–proton product decays were shorter, with a time scale of 10^{−23} s. The problem of this mismatch was solved by Abraham Pais who postulated the new quantum number strangeness that is conserved in strong interactions but violated by the weak interactions. Strange particles appear copiously due to "associated production" of a strange and an antistrange particle together. It was soon shown that this could not be a multiplicative quantum number, because that should allow reactions that were never seen in the new synchrotrons that were commissioned in Brookhaven National Laboratory in 1953 and in the Lawrence Berkeley Laboratory in 1955.

== CP violation in neutral meson oscillations ==
Initially it was thought that although parity was violated, CP (charge parity) symmetry was conserved. In order to understand the discovery of CP violation, it is necessary to understand the mixing of neutral kaons; this phenomenon does not require CP violation, but it is the context in which CP violation was first observed.

=== Neutral kaon mixing ===
Two different neutral K mesons, carrying different strangeness, can turn from one into another through the weak interactions, since these interactions do not conserve strangeness. The strange quark in the anti-K^{0} turns into a down quark by successively absorbing two W-bosons of opposite charge. The down antiquark in the anti-K^{0} turns into a strange antiquark by emitting them.

Since neutral kaons carry strangeness, they cannot be their own antiparticles. There must be then two different neutral kaons, differing by two units of strangeness. The question was then how to establish the presence of these two mesons. The solution used a phenomenon called neutral particle oscillations, by which these two kinds of mesons can turn from one into another through the weak interactions, which cause them to decay into pions (see the adjacent figure).

These oscillations were first investigated by Murray Gell-Mann and Abraham Pais together. They considered the CP-invariant time evolution of states with opposite strangeness. In matrix notation one can write

$$\psi(t) = U(t)\psi(0) = {\rm e}^{iHt} \begin{pmatrix}a \\ b\end{pmatrix}, \qquad H =\begin{pmatrix}M & \Delta\\ \Delta & M\end{pmatrix} ,$$

where ψ is a quantum state of the system specified by the amplitudes of being in each of the two basis states (which are a and b at time t = 0). The diagonal elements (M) of the Hamiltonian are due to strong interaction physics, which conserves strangeness. The two diagonal elements must be equal, since the particle and antiparticle have equal masses in the absence of the weak interactions. The off-diagonal elements, which mix opposite strangeness particles, are due to weak interactions; CP symmetry requires them to be real.

The consequence of the matrix H being real is that the probabilities of the two states will forever oscillate back and forth. However, if any part of the matrix were imaginary, as is forbidden by CP symmetry, then part of the combination will diminish over time. The diminishing part can be either one component (a) or the other (b), or a mixture of the two.

==== Mixing ====
The eigenstates are obtained by diagonalizing this matrix. This gives new eigenvectors, which we can call K_{1}, which is the difference of the two states of opposite strangeness, and K_{2}, which is the sum. The two are eigenstates of CP with opposite eigenvalues; K_{1} has CP = +1, and K_{2} has CP = −1 Since the two-pion final state also has CP = +1, only the K_{1} can decay this way. The K_{2} must decay into three pions.

Since the mass of K_{2} is just a little larger than the sum of the masses of three pions, this decay proceeds very slowly, about 600 times slower than the decay of K_{1} into two pions. These two different modes of decay were observed by Leon Lederman and his coworkers in 1956, establishing the existence of the two weak eigenstates (states with definite lifetimes under decays via the weak force) of the neutral kaons.

These two weak eigenstates are called the K_{L} (K-long, τ) and K_{S} (K-short, θ). CP symmetry, which was assumed at the time, implies that K_{S} = K_{1} and K_{L} = K_{2}.

==== Oscillation ====
An initially pure beam of K^{0} will turn into its antiparticle, K̅^{0}, while propagating, which will turn back into the original particle, K^{0}, and so on. This is called particle oscillation. On observing the weak decay into leptons, it was found that a K^{0} always decayed into a positron, whereas the antiparticle K̅^{0} decayed into the electron. The earlier analysis yielded a relation between the rate of electron and positron production from sources of pure K^{0} and its antiparticle K̅^{0}. Analysis of the time dependence of this semileptonic decay showed the phenomenon of oscillation, and allowed the extraction of the mass splitting between the K_{S} and K_{L}. Since this is due to weak interactions it is very small, 10^{−15} times the mass of each state, namely ∆M_{K} = M(K_{L}) − M(K_{S}) = (3.484±6)×10^{−12} MeV/c^{2}.

==== Regeneration ====
A beam of neutral kaons decays in flight so that the short-lived K_{S} disappears, leaving a beam of pure long-lived K_{L}. If this beam is shot into matter, then the K^{0} and its antiparticle K̅^{0} interact differently with the nuclei. The K^{0} has strangeness S=+1. Therefore, it only undergoes quasi-elastic scattering with nucleons and cannot produce hadrons due to conservation of baryon number and strangeness in strong interactions (there are no baryons with positive strangeness). On the other hand, its antiparticle has S=−1, can produce hyperons and their resonances, and is therefore absorbed much stronger by matter. Quantum coherence between the two particles is lost due to the different interactions that the two components separately engage in. The emerging beam then contains different linear superpositions of the K^{0} and K̅^{0}. Such a superposition is a mixture of K_{L} and K_{S}; the K_{S} is regenerated by passing a neutral kaon beam through matter, which was predicted by Abraham Pais and Oreste Piccioni in 1955. Regeneration was first observed experimentally in 1960 by Piccioni and his collaborators at Lawrence Berkeley National Laboratory. In 1963, Robert Adair and coworkers discovered excess K_{S} regeneration, which eventually led to the discovery of CP violation.

=== CP violation ===
While trying to verify Adair's results, J. Christenson, James Cronin, Val Fitch and Rene Turlay of Princeton University found decays of K_{L} into two pions (CP = +1) in an experiment performed in 1964 at the Alternating Gradient Synchrotron at the Brookhaven laboratory. As explained in an earlier section, this required the assumed initial and final states to have different values of CP, and hence immediately suggested CP violation. Alternative explanations such as nonlinear quantum mechanics and a new unobserved particle (hyperphoton) were soon ruled out, leaving CP violation as the only possibility. Cronin and Fitch received the Nobel Prize in Physics for this discovery in 1980.

It turns out that although the K_{L} and K_{S} are weak eigenstates (because they have definite lifetimes for decay by way of the weak force), they are not quite CP eigenstates. Instead, for small ε (and up to normalization),

K_{L} = K_{2} + εK_{1}

and similarly for K_{S}. Thus occasionally the K_{L} decays as a K_{1} with CP = +1, and likewise the K_{S} can decay with CP = −1. This is known as indirect CP violation, CP violation due to mixing of K^{0} and its antiparticle. There is also a direct CP violation effect, in which the CP violation occurs during the decay itself. Both are present, because both mixing and decay arise from the same interaction with the W boson and thus have CP violation predicted by the CKM matrix. Direct CP violation was discovered in the kaon decays in the early 2000s by the NA48 and KTeV experiments at CERN and Fermilab.

== See also ==
- Hadrons, mesons, hyperons and flavour
- Strange quark and the quark model
- Parity (physics), charge conjugation, time reversal symmetry, CPT invariance and CP violation
- Neutrino oscillation
- Neutral particle oscillation

== Bibliography ==
- Amsler, C.; Doser, M.; Antonelli, M.; Asner, D.; Babu, K.; Baer, H.; et al. (Particle Data Group) (2008). "Review of Particle Physics" (PDF). Physics Letters B. 667 (1): 1–1340. Bibcode:2008PhLB..667....1A. doi:10.1016/j.physletb.2008.07.018. hdl:1854/LU-685594. S2CID 227119789. Archived from the original (PDF) on 2020-09-07.
- Eidelman, S.; Hayes, K.G.; Olive, K.A.; Aguilar-Benitez, M.; Amsler, C.; Asner, D.; et al. (Particle Data Group) (2004). "Review of Particle Physics". Physics Letters B. 592 (1): 1. arXiv:astro-ph/0406663. Bibcode:2004PhLB..592....1P. doi:10.1016/j.physletb.2004.06.001.
- The quark model, by J.J.J. Kokkedee
- Sozzi, M.S. (2008). Discrete symmetries and CP violation. Oxford University Press. ISBN 978-0-19-929666-8.
- Bigi, I. I.; Sanda, A.I. (2000). CP violation. Cambridge University Press. ISBN 0-521-44349-0.
- Griffiths, D. J. (1987). Introduction to Elementary Particle. John Wiley & Sons. ISBN 0-471-60386-4.
