= T meson =

Subatomic particle

- Composition: T^{0}: tu̅; T^{+}: td̅; T^{+}_{s}: ts̅; T^{0}_{c}: tc̅; T^{+}_{b}: tb̅
- Statistics: bosonic
- Family: meson
- Interactions: strong, weak, gravitational, electromagnetic
- Status: hypothetical
- Symbol: T^{0}, T^{+}, T^{+}_{s}, T^{0}_{c}, T^{+}_{b}
- Antiparticle: T^{0}: T̅^{0}; T^{+}: T^{−}; T^{+}_{s}: T^{−}_{s}; T^{0}_{c}: T̅^{0}_{c}; T^{−}_{b}: T^{+}_{b}
- Electric charge: T^{0}, T^{0}_{c}: 0 e T^{+}, T^{+}_{s}, T^{+}_{b}: +1 e
- Topness: +1
- Isospin: 0

T mesons are hypothetical mesons composed of a top quark and one additional subatomic particle. The second subatomic particle can be either an up antiquark (T^{0}), down antiquark (T^{+}), strange antiquark (T^{+}_{s}), charm antiquark (T^{0}_{c}) or bottom antiquark (T^{+}_{b}). Because of the top quark's short lifetime, T mesons are not expected to be found in nature.

The combination of a top quark and top antiquark is not an open T meson, but rather a closed top-quark meson called toponium. Each T meson has an antiparticle that is composed of a top antiquark and an up (T̅^{0}), down (T^{−}), strange (T^{−}_{s}), charm quark (T̅^{0}_{c}) or bottom quark (T^{−}_{b}) respectively.
