= Aihud Pevsner =

American experimental physicist (1925–2018)

- אייהוד פבזנר
- Born: December 18, 1925; Haifa, Mandatory Palestine
- Died: June 17, 2018 (aged 92)
- Education: Columbia University
- Known for: Eta meson
- Scientific career
- Fields: Experimental physics
- Workplaces: Johns Hopkins University

Aihud Pevsner (Hebrew: אייהוד פבזנר; December 18, 1925 – June 17, 2018) was an American experimental physicist who was the lead researcher credited with the discovery of the Eta meson.

Born in Haifa, Mandatory Palestine, to Yoshua Pevsner and Esther Ben-Yeshaia, Aihud Pevsner immigrated to the United States with his parents at the age of three. The family, of Belarusian-Jewish descent, settled in New York. Pevsner served in the United States Navy from 1944 to 1945, and married Lucille Wolf in 1949.

Upon earning a doctorate in physics from Columbia University, he began teaching at the Massachusetts Institute of Technology. In 1956, Pevsner joined the Johns Hopkins University faculty. Over the course of his career, Pevsner received two Guggenheim fellowships, was named a Fulbright Scholar, and granted fellowship by the American Physical Society. He was the lead researcher credited with the discovery of the Eta meson, and appointed a Jacob L. Hain professor in 1977.

Pevsner died at the age of 92 on June 17, 2018.
