= Hadron spectroscopy =

Subfield of particle physics

Hadron spectroscopy is the subfield of particle physics that studies the masses and decays of hadrons. Hadron spectroscopy is also an important part of the new nuclear physics. The properties of hadrons are described by a theory called quantum chromodynamics (QCD).

QCD predicts that quarks and antiquarks bind into particles called mesons. Another type of hadron is called a baryon, that is made of three quarks. There is good experimental evidence for both mesons and baryons. Potentially QCD also has bound states of just gluons called glueballs. One of the goals of the field of hadronic spectroscopy is to find experimental evidence for exotic mesons, tetraquarks, molecules of hadrons, and glueballs.

An important part of the field of hadronic spectroscopy are the attempts to solve QCD. The properties of hadrons require the solution of QCD in the strong coupling regime, where perturbative techniques based on Feynman diagrams do not work. There are several approaches to trying to solve QCD to compute the masses of hadrons:

- Quark models
- Lattice QCD
- Effective field theory
- sum rules

== Experimental facilities ==
- Jefferson Lab in the US.
- J-PARC in Japan.
- GSI Darmstadt Germany.
- COMPASS CERN, Switzerland.
