= Semileptonic decay =

Hadron decay process into both leptons and hadrons

In particle physics the semileptonic decay of a hadron is a decay caused by the weak force in which one lepton (and the corresponding neutrino) is produced in addition to one or more hadrons. An example for this can be

K^{0} → e^{−} + ν̅_{e} + π^{+}

This is to be contrasted with purely hadronic decays, such as K^{0} → π^{+} + π^{−}, which are also mediated by the weak force.

Semileptonic decays of neutral kaons have been used to study kaon oscillations.

== See also ==
- Kaon
- Pion
- CP violation
- CPT symmetry
