= B meson =

Subatomic particle

- Composition: B^{+}: ub̅; B^{0}: db̅; B^{0}_{s}: sb̅; B^{+}_{c}: cb̅
- Statistics: bosonic
- Family: mesons
- Interactions: strong, weak, electromagnetic, gravitational
- Symbol: B^{+}, B^{−}, B^{0}, B̅^{0}, B^{0}_{s}, B̅^{0}_{s}, B^{+}_{c}, B^{−}_{c}
- Antiparticle: B^{+}: B^{−}; B^{0}: B̅^{0}; B^{0}_{s}: B̅^{0}_{s}; B^{+}_{c}: B^{−}_{c}
- Mass: B^{+}: 5279.34±0.12 MeV/c^{2}; B^{0}: 5279.65±0.12 MeV/c^{2}; B^{0}_{s}: 5366.88±0.14 MeV/c^{2}; B^{+}_{c}: 6274.9±0.8 MeV/c^{2}
- Mean lifetime: B^{+}: (1.638±0.004)×10^{−12} s; B^{0}: (1.519±0.004)×10^{−12} s; B^{0}_{s}: (1.515±0.004)×10^{−12} s; B^{+}_{c}: (0.510±0.009)×10^{−12} s
- Electric charge: B^{±}, B^{±}_{c}: ±1 e; B^{0}, B^{0}_{s}: 0 e
- Spin: 0 ħ
- Strangeness: B^{0}_{s}: −1
- Charm: B^{+}_{c}: +1
- Bottomness: +1
- Isospin: B^{+}: +1/2; B^{0}: −1/2; B^{0}_{s}, B^{+}_{c}: 0
- Parity: −1

In particle physics, B mesons are mesons composed of a bottom antiquark and either an up (B^{+}), down (B^{0}), strange (B^{0}_{s}) or charm quark (B^{+}_{c}). The combination of a bottom antiquark and a top quark is not thought to be possible because of the top quark's short lifetime. The combination of a bottom antiquark and a bottom quark is not a B meson, but rather bottomonium, which is something else entirely.

Each B meson has an antiparticle that is composed of a bottom quark and an up (B^{−}), down (B̅^{0}), strange (B̅^{0}_{s}) or charm (B^{−}_{c}) antiquark respectively.

== List of B mesons ==
B mesons
Particle	Symbol	Anti- particle	Quark content	Charge [e]	I	J^{P}	Rest mass [MeV/c^{2}]	S	C	B′	Mean lifetime [s]	Commonly decays to
Charged B meson	B^{+}	B^{−}	ub̅	+1	1/2	0^{−}	5279.34±0.12	0	0	+1	(1.638±0.004)×10^{−12}	see B^{±} decay modes
Neutral B meson	B^{0}	B̅^{0}	db̅	0	1/2	0^{−}	5279.65±0.12	0	0	+1	(1.519±0.004)×10^{−12}	see B^{0} decay modes
Strange B meson	B^{0}_{s}	B̅^{0}_{s}	sb̅	0	0	0^{−}	5366.88±0.14	−1	0	+1	(1.515±0.004)×10^{−12}	see B^{0}_{s} decay modes
charmed B meson	B^{+}_{c}	B^{−}_{c}	cb̅	+1	0	0^{−}	6274.9±0.8	0	+1	+1	(0.510±0.009)×10^{−12}	see B^{±}_{c} decay modes

== B^{0}–B̅^{0} oscillations ==
The neutral B mesons, B^{0} and B^{0}_{s}, spontaneously transform into their own antiparticles and back. This phenomenon is called flavor oscillation. The existence of neutral B meson oscillations is a fundamental prediction of the Standard Model of particle physics. It has been measured in the B^{0}–B̅^{0} system to be about 0.496 / picosecond, and in the B^{0}_{s}–B̅^{0}_{s} system to be Δm_{s} = 17.77 ± 0.10 (stat) ± 0.07 (syst) / picosecond measured by CDF experiment at Fermilab. A first estimation of the lower and upper limit of the B^{0}_{s}–B̅^{0}_{s} system value have been made by the DØ experiment also at Fermilab.

On 25 September 2006, Fermilab announced that they had claimed discovery of previously-only-theorized B^{0}_{s} meson oscillation. According to Fermilab's press release:

This first major discovery of Run 2 continues the tradition of particle physics discoveries at Fermilab, where the bottom (1977) and top (1995) quarks were discovered. Surprisingly, the bizarre behavior of the B^{0}_{s} (pronounced "B sub s") mesons is actually predicted by the Standard Model of fundamental particles and forces. The discovery of this oscillatory behavior is thus another reinforcement of the Standard Model's durability ...

CDF physicists have previously measured the rate of the matter–antimatter transitions for the B^{0}_{s} meson, which consists of the heavy bottom quark bound by the strong nuclear interaction to a strange antiquark. Now they have achieved the standard for a discovery in the field of particle physics, where the probability for a false observation must be proven to be less than about 5 in 10 million (5/10000000 = 1/2000000). For CDF's result the probability is even smaller, at 8 in 100 million (8/100000000 = 1/12500000).

Ronald Kotulak, writing for the Chicago Tribune, called the particle "bizarre" and stated that the meson "may open the door to a new era of physics" with its proven interactions with the "spooky realm of antimatter".

On 14 May 2010, physicists at the Fermi National Accelerator Laboratory reported that the oscillations decayed into matter 1% more often than into antimatter, which may help explain the abundance of matter over antimatter in the observed Universe. However, more recent results at LHCb with larger data samples have suggested no significant deviation from the Standard Model.

== Rare decays ==
B mesons are an important probe for exploring quantum chromodynamics. Various uncommon decay paths of the B mesons are sensitive to physics processes outside the standard model. Measuring these rare branching fractions sets limits on new particles. The LHCb experiment has observed and searched for several of these decays such as B_{s} → μ^{+} μ^{−}.

On 21 February 2017, the LHCb collaboration announced that the rare decay of a neutral B meson into two oppositely charged kaons had been observed to a statistical significance of 5σ.

== See also ==
- B–B̅ oscillation
