= C parity =

Unitary operation that transforms a particle in its antiparticle

In physics, the C parity or charge parity is a multiplicative quantum number of some particles that describes their behavior under the symmetry operation of charge conjugation.

Charge conjugation changes the sign of all quantum charges (that is, additive quantum numbers), including the electrical charge, baryon number and lepton number, and the flavor charges strangeness, charm, bottomness, topness and Isospin (I_{3}). In contrast, it doesn't affect the mass, linear momentum or spin of a particle.

== Formalism ==
Consider an operation $\mathcal{C}$ that transforms a particle into its antiparticle,

$$\mathcal C \, |\psi\rangle = | \bar{\psi} \rangle.$$

Both states must be normalizable, so that

$$1 = \langle \psi | \psi \rangle = \langle \bar{\psi} | \bar{\psi} \rangle = \langle \psi |\mathcal{C}^\dagger \mathcal C| \psi \rangle,$$

which implies that $\mathcal C$ is unitary,

$$\mathcal C \mathcal{C}^\dagger =\mathbf{1}.$$

By acting on the particle twice with the $\mathcal{C}$ operator,

$$\mathcal{C}^2 |\psi\rangle = \mathcal{C} |\bar{\psi}\rangle = |\psi \rangle,$$

we see that $\mathcal{C}^2=\mathbf{1}$ and $\mathcal{C}=\mathcal{C}^{-1}$. Putting this all together, we see that

$$\mathcal{C}=\mathcal{C}^{\dagger},$$

meaning that the charge conjugation operator is Hermitian and therefore a physically observable quantity.

=== Eigenvalues ===
For the eigenstates of charge conjugation,

$$\mathcal C \, |\psi\rangle = \eta_C \, | {\psi} \rangle$$.

As with parity transformations, applying $\mathcal{C}$ twice must leave the particle's state unchanged,

$$\mathcal{C}^2|\psi\rangle = \eta_C \mathcal{C} |{\psi} \rangle = \eta_{C}^{2} |\psi\rangle = | \psi \rangle$$

allowing only eigenvalues of $\eta_C = \pm 1$ the so-called C-parity or charge parity of the particle.

=== Eigenstates ===
The above implies that for eigenstates, $\ \operatorname{\mathcal C} |\psi\rangle = | \overline{\psi} \rangle = \pm | \psi \rangle ~.$ Since antiparticles and particles have charges of opposite sign, only states with all quantum charges equal to zero, such as the photon and particle–antiparticle bound states like π^{0}, η^{0}, or positronium, are eigenstates of $\mathcal C ~.$

== Multiparticle systems ==
For a system of free particles, the C parity is the product of C parities for each particle.

In a pair of bound mesons there is an additional component due to the orbital angular momentum. For example, in a bound state of two pions, π^{+} π^{−} with an orbital angular momentum L, exchanging π^{+} and π^{−} inverts the relative position vector, which is identical to a parity operation. Under this operation, the angular part of the spatial wave function contributes a phase factor of (−1)^{L}, where L is the angular momentum quantum number associated with L.

$$\mathcal C \, | \pi^+ \, \pi^- \rangle = (-1)^L \, | \pi^+ \, \pi^- \rangle$$.

With a two-fermion system, two extra factors appear: One factor comes from the spin part of the wave function, and the second by considering the intrinsic parities of both the particles. Note that a fermion and an antifermion always have opposite intrinsic parity. Hence,

$$\mathcal C \, | f \, \bar f \rangle = (-1)^L (-1)^{S+1} (-1) \, | f \, \bar f \rangle = (-1)^{L + S} \, | f \, \bar f \rangle ~.$$

Bound states can be described with the spectroscopic notation ^{2S+1}L_{J} (see term symbol), where S is the total spin quantum number (not to be confused with the S orbital), J is the total angular momentum quantum number, and L the total orbital momentum quantum number (with quantum number L = 0, 1, 2, etc. replaced by orbital letters S, P, D, etc.).

Example
positronium is a bound state electron-positron similar to a hydrogen atom. The names parapositronium and orthopositronium are given to the states ^{1}S_{0} and ^{3}S_{1}.

- With S = 0, the spins are anti-parallel, and with S = 1 they are parallel. This gives a multiplicity ( 2 S + 1 ) of 1 (anti-parallel) or 3 (parallel)
- The total orbital angular momentum quantum number is L = 0 (spectroscopic S orbital)
- Total angular momentum quantum number is J = 0 or 1
- C parity η_{C} = (−1)^{L + S} = +1 or −1 , depending on L and S. Since charge parity is preserved, annihilation of these states in photons ( η_{C}(γ) = −1 ) must be:

Orbital:	^{1}S_{0} → γ + γ	^{3}S_{1} → γ + γ + γ
η_{C} :	+1 = (−1) × (−1)	−1 = (−1) × (−1) × (−1)

== Experimental tests of C-parity conservation ==
- $\pi^0 \rightarrow 3 \gamma$: The neutral pion, $\pi^0$, is observed to decay to two photons, γ+γ . We can infer that the pion therefore has $\ \eta_C=(-1)^2 = 1\ ,$ but each additional γ introduces a factor of −1 to the overall C-parity of the pion. The decay to 3γ would violate C parity conservation. A search for this decay was conducted using pions created in the reaction $\ \pi^{-} + p \rightarrow \pi^0 + n ~.$
- $\eta \rightarrow \pi^{+} \pi^{-} \pi^{0}$: Decay of the eta meson.
- $p \bar{p}$ annihilations

== See also ==
- G-parity
