= Topness =

Topness (symbol T) or truth is a flavour quantum number that represents the difference between the number of top quarks (t) and number of top antiquarks (t̅) present in a particle:

$$T = n_\text{t} - n_\bar{\text{t}}$$

By convention, top quarks have a topness of +1 and top antiquarks have a topness of −1. The term "topness" is rarely used; most physicists simply refer to "the number of top quarks" and "the number of top antiquarks".

== Conservation ==
Like all flavour quantum numbers, topness is preserved under strong and electromagnetic interactions, but not under weak interaction. However the top quark is extremely unstable, with a half-life under 10^{−23} s, which is the required time for the strong interaction to take place. For that reason the top quark does not hadronize, that is, it never forms any meson or baryon, so the topness of a meson or a baryon is always zero. By the time it can interact strongly it has already decayed to another flavour of quark (usually to a bottom quark).
