= Multiplicative quantum number =

Type of quantum number

In quantum field theory, multiplicative quantum numbers are conserved quantum numbers of a special kind. A given quantum number q is said to be additive if in a particle reaction the sum of the q-values of the interacting particles is the same before and after the reaction. Most conserved quantum numbers are additive in this sense; the electric charge is one example. A multiplicative quantum number q is one for which the corresponding product, rather than the sum, is preserved.

Any conserved quantum number is a symmetry of the Hamiltonian of the system (see Noether's theorem). Symmetry groups which are examples of the abstract group called Z_{2} give rise to multiplicative quantum numbers. This group consists of an operation, P, whose square is the identity, P^{2} = 1. Thus, all symmetries which are mathematically similar to parity (physics) give rise to multiplicative quantum numbers.

In principle, multiplicative quantum numbers can be defined for any abelian group. An example would be to trade the electric charge, Q, (related to the abelian group U(1) of electromagnetism), for the new quantum number exp(2iπ Q). Then this becomes a multiplicative quantum number by virtue of the charge being an additive quantum number. However, this route is usually followed only for discrete subgroups of U(1), of which Z_{2} finds the widest possible use.

== See also ==
- Parity, C-symmetry, T-symmetry and G-parity
