= G parity =

Operation in particle physics

In particle physics, G parity is a multiplicative quantum number that results from the generalization of C parity (charge conjugation) to multiplets of particles.

It was introduced by Louis Michel in 1953 as isotopic parity, and later introduced as G parity by T.D. Lee and C.N. Yang in 1956.

== Description ==
Charge conjugation or C parity applies only to neutral systems. For example, in the pion triplet, only the neutral pion π^{0} has C parity. On the other hand, strong interaction does not see electrical charge, so it cannot distinguish amongst π^{+}, π^{0} and π^{−}. We can generalize the C parity so it applies to all charge states of a given multiplet:
$$\mathcal G: \begin{pmatrix} \pi^+ \\ \pi^0 \\ \pi^- \end{pmatrix} = \eta_G \begin{pmatrix} \pi^+ \\ \pi^0 \\ \pi^- \end{pmatrix}$$
where η_{G} = ±1 are the eigenvalues of G parity. The G parity operator is defined as
$$\hat\mathcal G = \hat\mathcal C \, e^{(i \pi \hat I_2)}$$
where $\hat\mathcal C$ is the C parity operator, and $\hat I_2$ is the operator associated with the 2nd component of the isospin "vector", which in case of isospin $I=1/2$ takes the form $\hat I_2=\sigma_2/2$, where $\sigma_2$ is the second Pauli matrix. G-parity is a combination of charge conjugation and a π radians (180°) rotation around the 2nd axis of isospin space. Given that charge and isospin are preserved by strong interactions, so is G. Weak and electromagnetic interactions, though, does not conserve G parity.

Since G parity is applied on a whole multiplet, charge conjugation has to see the multiplet as a neutral entity. Thus, only multiplets with an average charge of 0 will be eigenstates of G, that is
$$\bar Q = \bar B = \bar Y = 0,$$
where Q is the electric charge of the multiplet, B is the baryon number and Y of the hypercharge.

In general
$$\eta_{\mathrm G} = \eta_{\mathrm C} \, (-1)^I$$
where η_{C} is a C parity eigenvalue, and I is the isospin.

Since no matter whether the system is fermion–antifermion or boson–antiboson, $\eta_{\mathrm C}$ always equals to $(-1)^{L+S}$, we have
$$\eta_{\mathrm G} = (-1)^{S + L + I}\,.$$

== See also ==
- Quark model
