= Bottom quark =

Type of quark

- Composition: elementary particle
- Statistics: fermionic
- Family: quark
- Generation: third
- Interactions: strong, weak, electromagnetic, gravity
- Symbol: b
- Antiparticle: bottom antiquark (b̅)
- Theorized: Makoto Kobayashi and Toshihide Maskawa (1973)
- Discovered: Leon M. Lederman et al. (1977)
- Mass: 4.18+0.04 −0.03 GeV/c^{2} (M̅S̅ scheme); 4.65+0.03 −0.03 GeV/c^{2} (1S scheme)
- Decays into: charm quark or up quark
- Electric charge: −1/3 e
- Color charge: yes
- Spin: 1/2 ħ
- Weak isospin: LH: − 1/2, RH: 0
- Weak hypercharge: LH: 1/3, RH: − 2/3

The bottom quark (symbol: b) is an elementary particle of the third generation. It is a heavy quark with a charge of −1/3 e.

All quarks are described in a similar way by electroweak interaction and quantum chromodynamics, but the bottom quark has exceptionally low rates of transition to lower-mass quarks. The bottom quark is also notable because it is a product in almost all top quark decays, and is a frequent decay product of the Higgs boson.

== History ==
The existence of a third generation of quarks to explain observed CP violation in kaon decay was predicted in 1973 by Makoto Kobayashi and Toshihide Maskawa. They did not propose names for their two theorised particles, and many physicists started to call them truth and beauty quarks. The names top and bottom, which became the accepted terms, were introduced by Haim Harari in 1975 to match the names of the first generation of quarks (up and down), reflecting the fact that the two were the "up" and "down" component of a weak isospin doublet.

Evidence for the bottom quark was first obtained in 1977 by the Fermilab E288 experiment team led by Leon M. Lederman, when proton-nucleon collisions produced bottomonium decaying to pairs of muons. The discovery was confirmed about a year later by the PLUTO and DASP2 Collaborations at the electron-positron collider DORIS at DESY. It was reported at the time that DESY scientists were in favor of the name "beauty", while the American scientists tended towards "bottom".

Kobayashi and Maskawa won the 2008 Nobel Prize in Physics for their explanation of CP-violation.

== Distinct character ==
The bottom quark's "bare" mass is around 4.18 GeV/c^{2} – a bit more than four times the mass of a proton, and many orders of magnitude larger than common "light" quarks.

Although it almost exclusively transitions from or to a top quark, the bottom quark can decay into either an up quark or charm quark via the weak interaction. CKM matrix elements V_{ub} and V_{cb} specify the rates, where both these decays are suppressed, making lifetimes of most bottom particles (~10^{−12} s) somewhat longer than those of charmed particles (~10^{−13} s), but shorter than those of strange particles (from ~10^{−10} to ~10^{−8} s).

The combination of high mass and low transition rate gives experimental collision byproducts containing a bottom quark a distinctive signature that makes them relatively easy to identify using a technique called "B-tagging". For that reason, mesons containing the bottom quark are exceptionally long-lived for their mass, and are the easiest particles to use to investigate CP violation. Such experiments are being performed at the BaBar, Belle and LHCb experiments.

== Hadrons containing bottom quarks ==
Some of the hadrons containing bottom quarks include:

- B mesons contain a bottom quark (or its antiparticle) and an up or down quark.
- B_{c} and B_{s} mesons contain a bottom quark along with a charm quark or strange quark respectively.
- There are many bottomonium states, for example the ϒ meson and χ_{b}(3P), the first particle discovered in LHC. These consist of a bottom quark and its antiparticle.
- Bottom baryons have been observed, and are named in analogy with strange baryons (e.g. Λ^{0}_{b}).

== See also ==
- Quark model
- B-factory
- B meson
