= Total angular momentum quantum number =

Quantum number related to rotational symmetry

In quantum mechanics, the total angular momentum quantum number parametrises the total angular momentum of a given particle, by combining its orbital angular momentum and its intrinsic angular momentum (i.e., its spin).

If s is the particle's spin angular momentum and ℓ its orbital angular momentum vector, the total angular momentum j is $\mathbf j = \mathbf s + \boldsymbol {\ell} ~.$

The associated quantum number is the main total angular momentum quantum number j. It can take the following range of values, jumping only in integer steps: $\vert \ell - s\vert \le j \le \ell + s$ where ℓ is the azimuthal quantum number (parameterizing the orbital angular momentum) and s is the spin quantum number (parameterizing the spin).

The relation between the total angular momentum vector j and the total angular momentum quantum number j is given by the usual relation (see angular momentum quantum number) $\Vert \mathbf j \Vert = \sqrt{j \, (j+1)} \, \hbar$

The vector's z-projection is given by $j_z = m_j \, \hbar$ where m_{j} is the secondary total angular momentum quantum number, and the $\hbar$ is the reduced Planck constant. It ranges from −j to +j in steps of one. This generates 2j + 1 different values of m_{j}.

The total angular momentum corresponds to the Casimir invariant of the Lie algebra so(3) of the three-dimensional rotation group.

== See also ==
- Canonical commutation relation § Uncertainty relation for angular momentum operators
- Principal quantum number
- Orbital angular momentum quantum number
- Magnetic quantum number
- Spin quantum number
- Angular momentum coupling
- Clebsch–Gordan coefficients
- Angular momentum diagrams (quantum mechanics)
- Rotational spectroscopy
