= Bottomness =

Term used in physics to refer to the number of bottom quarks

In physics, bottomness (symbol B′; using a prime as plain B is used already for baryon number) or beauty is a flavour quantum number reflecting the difference between the number of bottom antiquarks (n_{b̅}) and the number of bottom quarks (n_{b}) that are present in a particle:

$$B^\prime = -(n_b - n_{\bar b})$$

Bottom quarks have (by convention) a bottomness of −1 while bottom antiquarks have a bottomness of +1. The convention is that the flavour quantum number sign for the quark is the same as the sign of the electric charge (symbol Q) of that quark (in this case, Q = −1/3).

== Conservation ==
As with other flavour-related quantum numbers, bottomness is preserved under strong and electromagnetic interactions, but not under weak interactions. For first-order weak reactions, it holds that $\Delta B^\prime = \plusmn 1$.

This term is rarely used. Most physicists simply refer to "the number of bottom quarks" and "the number of bottom antiquarks".
