= B–Bbar oscillation =

Neutral B meson oscillations (or B–B̅ oscillations) are one of the manifestations of the neutral particle oscillation, a fundamental prediction of the Standard Model of particle physics. It is the phenomenon of B mesons changing (or oscillating) between their matter and antimatter forms before their decay. The B_{s} meson can exist as either a bound state of a strange antiquark and a bottom quark, or a strange quark and bottom antiquark. The oscillations in the neutral B sector are analogous to the phenomena that produce long and short-lived neutral kaons.

B_{s}–B̅_{s} mixing was observed by the CDF experiment at Fermilab in 2006 and by LHCb at CERN in 2011 and 2021.

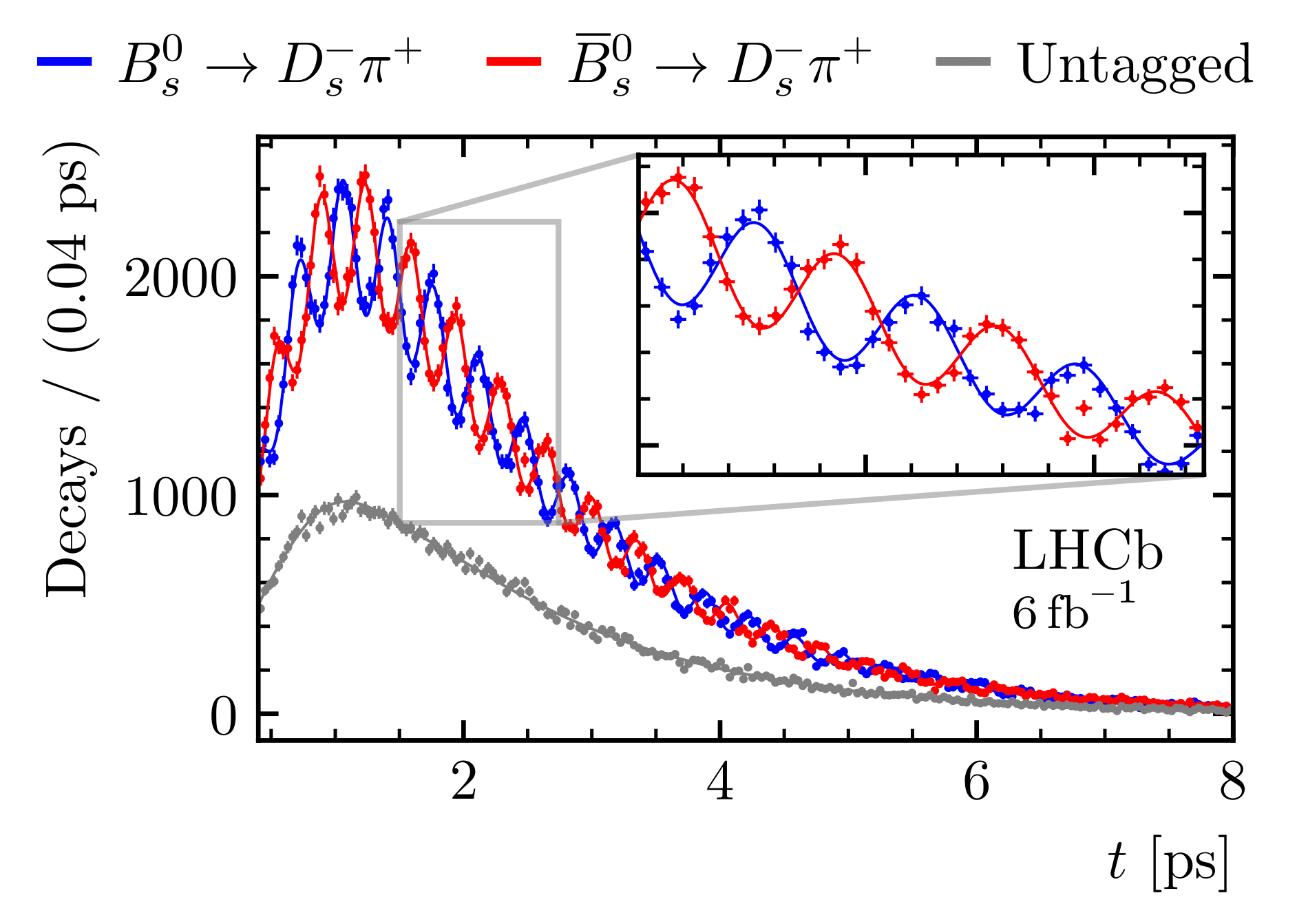
B-bar oscillations detected via their respective D meson and Pion decays as seen by the LHCb in 2021. $\overline{B}_s^0\to D_s^-\pi^+$ stands for the oscillation process $\overline{B}_s^0\to B_s^0\to D_s^-\pi^+$.

== Excess of matter over antimatter ==
The Standard Model predicts that regular matter B_{s} mesons are slightly favored in these oscillations over their antimatter counterpart, making strange B mesons of special interest to particle physicists. The observation of the B–B̅ mixing phenomena led physicists to propose the construction of the so-named "B factories" in the early 1990s. They realized that a precise B–B̅ oscillation measure could pin down the unitarity triangle and perhaps explain the excess of matter over antimatter in the universe. To this end construction began on two "B factories" in the late nineties, one at the Stanford Linear Accelerator Center (SLAC) in California and one at KEK in Japan.

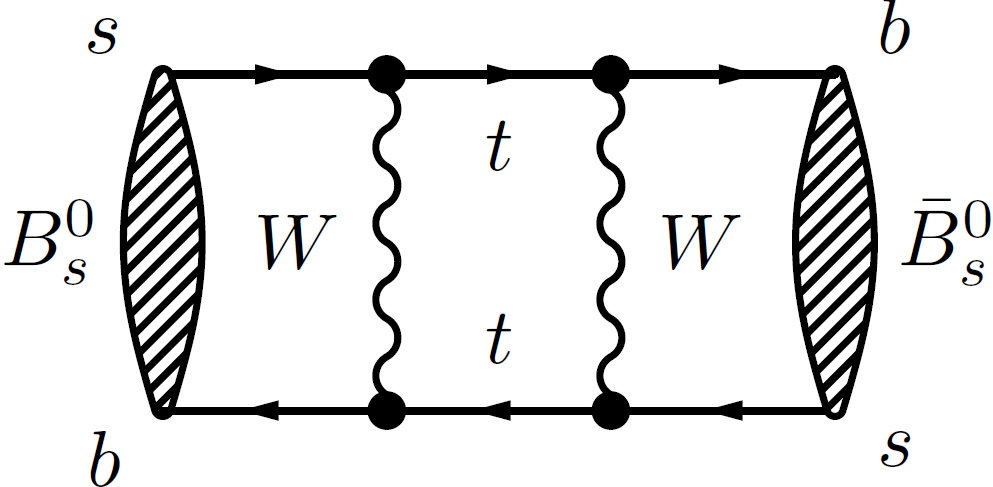
The oscillations are mediated by the W boson and the top quark; being heavier than the B_{s}–B̅_{s} mesons, they act as short lived virtual particles

These B factories, BaBar and Belle, were set at the ϒ(4S) resonance which is just above the threshold for decay into two B mesons.

On 14 May 2010, physicists at the Fermi National Accelerator Laboratory reported that the oscillations decayed into matter 1% more often than into antimatter, which may help explain the abundance of matter over antimatter in the observed Universe. However, more recent results at LHCb in 2011, 2012, and 2021 with larger data samples have demonstrated no significant deviation from the Standard Model prediction of very nearly zero asymmetry.

== See also ==
- Baryogenesis
- CP Violation
- Kaon
- Neutral particle oscillation
- Strange B meson
