= Maria Fidecaro =

Italian physicist

- Education: University of Rome
- Scientific career
- Fields: Physics
- Workplaces: CERN - European Organization for Nuclear Research

Maria Fidecaro (1930-2023), née Cervasi, was an Italian experimental physicist with a focus on particle physics. She has spent most of her career at CERN, where she after retirement had the status of honorary member of the personnel.

Maria received her degrees in Physics from the University of Rome in the 1940s.

In 1954, she obtained a fellowship from the International Federation of University Women to do research at the University of Liverpool where she also defended her master thesis. In July 1955, she married Giuseppe Fidecaro, a fellow physicist. In 1956, Maria obtained a CERN fellowship. She was among the pioneering scientists at CERN since the establishment of the institution.

== Scientific research ==
After Maria's marriage, she and Giuseppe carried out experiments on pions. Maria worked with a diffusion chamber and Giuseppe with a lead glass Cherenkov counter.

Maria and Giuseppe were also involved in cosmic rays experiment in the Italian Alps just after the war. The experiment was set at 3,500 meters on the face of Matterhorn, using a detector of 1-square meter.

After Maria and Giuseppe moved to Geneva, Giuseppe was assigned to the Synchrocyclotron Division. The Synchrocyclotron was the first accelerator to be built at CERN in 1957. Meanwhile, Maria worked on a novel method to provide polarized proton beams to be used for particle collision in the accelerator.

Throughout her career as an experimental physicist, she co-signed close to 200 publications.

The majority of her research relates directly to the experiments, including interpreting the measurements and results in the search for new particles. In Maria's early works in the 1960s, she studied the nucleon-nucleon charge exchange scattering, recorded data on high-energy electrodynamic processes.

Her research work also tackled the phenomenon of proton-proton elastic scattering. In the 1990s, she investigated the design and test of a prototype gas-sampling electromagnetic calorimeter of high granularity and collaborated on the construction of a position-sensitive photon detector for the CPLEAR experiment. CPLEAR experiment aims to carry out precision measurements of CP, T and CPT violation of the neutral kaon systems.

Maria's other work focused on phenomenological aspects of particle physics. She studied the fundamental symmetries in the neutral kaon systems. By the measurements of interactions and decays of neutral kaons, new and detailed information was found on CPT invariance in time evolution and decay. The newly achieved level of precision of the experiments called into question the validity of some of the often tacitly assumed hypotheses in particle physics. She was also involved in an experiment looking for neutron-antineutron oscillations at the nuclear reactor of the Institute Laue-Langevin at Grenoble.

Maria was also involved in the search for CP-violation (charge-parity violation) in the NA48 experiment. After the theory of CP-violation in the decay of neutral kaon system was experimentally confirmed, the discovery brought the Nobel Prize in Physics in 1980 to the discoverers of the theories, James Cronin, and Val Fitch. The discovery played an important role in helping scientists explain the dominance of matter over antimatter.

== Personal life ==
Maria and Giuseppe Fidecaro were the first few scientists among a total of 300 to 400 staff when CERN was first founded. During their time, few people could do experiments at CERN. Maria started with a group of only three scientists.

The couple, having devoted 60 years to research at CERN since its beginning, was seen as a living memory of the institute.

== Notes ==
- Maria Fidecaro, 1930-2023, From the Synchrocyclotron onward in CERN Courier, Nov 2023, page 34, pdf
- CERN Archives, CERN-ARCH-MARIA-FIDECARO
