= Lisa Mazzone =

Swiss politician (born 1988)

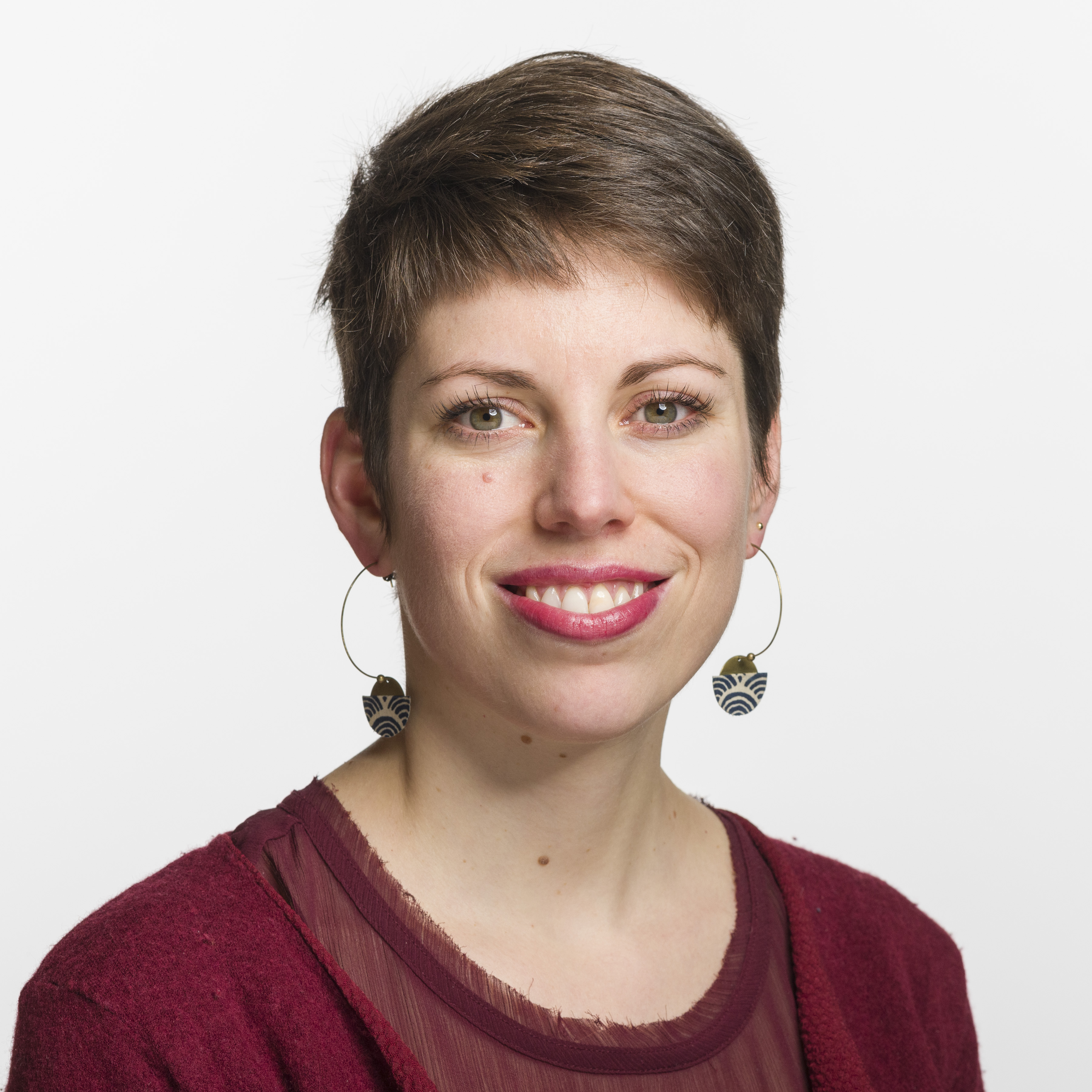
- Official portrait, 2019

President of the Green Party of Switzerland
- Incumbent
- Assumed office 7 April 2024
- Preceded by: Balthasar Glättli

Member of the Council of States (Switzerland)
- In office 2 December 2019 – 3 December 2023

Personal details
- Born: Lisa Marie Mazzone; 25 January 1988 (age 38) Geneva, Switzerland
- Citizenship: Switzerland; Italy
- Party: Green Party of Switzerland
- Domestic partner: Christoph Lenz (since 2018)
- Relations: Maria Fidecaro (grandmother)
- Children: 2
- Education: University of Geneva (BA)
- Website: Official website Parliament website

Lisa Marie Mazzone (French: [liza maˈzone]; Italian: [liza matˈtsoːne]; born 25 January 1988) is a left-wing Swiss politician who currently serves as President of the Green Party of Switzerland since 2024.

She previously served as a member of the Council of States (Switzerland) from 2019 to 2023, the National Council (Switzerland) from 2015 to 2019 and on the Grand Council of Geneva from 2013 to 2015. Most of her political interventions to date have involved environmental issues. She has been the youngest member elected to parliament at the time.

== Early life and education ==
Mazzone was born 25 January 1988, one of three children, to Sergio Mazzone, a biochemist and solar panel installer and city council member of Geneva, and Dr. Lucia Mazzone (née Fidecaro; 1959–2013), a psychiatrist. She has an older brother and younger sister.

She is of Italian and Swiss descent. Her two maternal grandparents were physicists, Giuseppe Fidecaro (1926–2024) and Maria Fidecaro (née Cervasi; 1930–2023), who came to Switzerland in 1956 to work at CERN, the European research center, in Geneva. She also has one Swiss German grandmother, Beatrice Gmür, who originally hailed from St. Gallen, was also employed there.

Mazzone was raised in Versoix, where she attended the local schools, obtaining her Matura from Collège André-Chavanne. Ultimately she studied French literature and Latin at the University of Geneva.

== Political career ==
In 2006, aged 18, Mazzone took part in the establishment of the Youth Parliament ("parlement des jeunes") at Versoix. She became a member of the national committee of the Swiss Federation of Youth Parliament in 2007/08. She joined the Green Party in 2008. She served as president of the Geneva party between March 2014 and March 2016. She then became Party Vice-President for the Suisse Romande region in succession to Robert Cramer on 16 April 2016.

Mazzone sat as a municipal councillor ("Conseil communal") in Le Grand-Saconnex - the multi-cultural central Geneva municipality which includes both the city airport and several major United Nations facilities within its boundaries - from 2011 till June 2013. 2013 was also the year in which she graduated from the University of Geneva with a Bachelor en Lettres degree in Latin and French. As she later explained to an interviewer, that was when she decided to devote herself 100% to her favourite pastime, political and social ("associatif") engagement. Later that year, on 6 October 2013, she was elected to membership of the Grand Council of Geneva ("Grand Conseil de Genève" / cantonal parliament) for the five-year term ending in 2018. The 2013 election had left the Green Party with just 10 of the 100 Grand Council seats. Within the Geneva parliament she was a member of the transport commission and of the energy commission, becoming chair of the latter in December 2014. In March 2014 she had become leader of the Green Party team.

Lisa Mazzone was elected to the Swiss parliament ("Conseil national" / "Consiglio Nazionale") on 18 October 2015, becoming Switzerland's youngest member of parliament. She delivered her ten-minute maiden speech to the National Council on 30 November 2015, which was her first day in the parliament. Under the relevant cantonal legislation, election to the national parliament had meant resignation from the Grand Council of Geneva on 12 November 2015. At the time of her election she told an interviewer:

- "My orientation, based on my personal values, moves me towards considerations about free time and about sharing - as regards 'things', wealth and knowledge. It is time to move on from the strict focus on economic productivity which prevails today ... the [political] left must launch its own initiatives, projects and referendums, and not spend its time on the defensive". (Note: «Mes valeurs m’orientent vers une réflexion pour davantage de temps libre et de partage — tant au niveau des biens, des richesses que des savoirs. Il est temps de sortir de l'approche strictement productiviste qui prévaut aujourd’hui .... La gauche doit lancer ses propres projets, initiatives et référendums et ne pas passer son temps sur la défensive.»)

In October 2018 Mazzone announced that in the 2019 national elections she would stand not for re-election to the National Council ("Conseil national" - lower house) but as a candidate for election to the Council of States (Switzerland) ("Conseil des États" / "Cussegl dals Stadi"), which is the upper house of the national parliament. The relationship between the two chambers of the Swiss national parliament is roughly analogous to that between the German Bundesrat (upper house) and Bundestag (lower house). In the elections for the "Conseil des États" she is hoping to win the seat made vacant by the recently announced retirement from the chamber of her party colleague Robert Cramer. The elections in question are scheduled for October 2019.

=== Political issues ===
==== Bicycles and transport ====
Many of the slopes around the foreshore at the western end of Lake Geneva are reassuringly gentle: Lisa Mazzone became a passionate advocate for cycling when she was barely a teenager. She worked as a co-ordinator for the Geneva Pro-Vélo association between 2010 and 2014. In 2014 she stepped down from that job in order to become Project Manager with the association. Since April 2015 she has also been vice-president at the "National Association for Transportation and the Environment" ("Association transports et environnement"). She has subsequently become the association's president for the francophone region surrounding Geneva.

=== Stop bunkers ===
Because of the country's exceptionally precautionary cold war era building regulations, far more Swiss homes and offices feature their own underground nuclear bunkers than equivalent buildings elsewhere in Western Europe. In February 2015 Lisa Mazzone came to prominence as a leader in the Grand Council of a small group of deputies supporting the so-called "stop bunkers" movement. The issue concerned the extent to which the city authorities, in defiance of building regulations stating that premises with a floor below ground level could not be used as living accommodation, had been using nuclear bunkers to accommodate asylum seekers. The "stop bunkers" protesters included (but were not restricted to) asylum seekers being accommodated underground who were complaining about lack of sunshine or ventilation, terrible and rotting food, the impossibility of sleeping under the 24-hour lighting and in the noisy conditions, and the indestrucability of the bed bugs.

==== Beyond parliament ====
Much of Lisa Mazzone's most visible political activity still takes place outside parliament. She chairs the organisation "Regional Co-ordination for a Geneva city airport respectful of the environment and of the residents" ("Coordination régionale pour un aéroport de Genève urbain, respectueux de l'environnement et de la population" / CARPE) which in December 2016 tabled a cantonal "people's initiative", backed by 14,450 signatures, calling for "democratic control in respect of Geneva airport" ("Pour un pilotage démocratique de l'aéroport de Genève").

She is co-president, along with Priska Seiler Graf of the Social Democratic Party in Zürich, of the "Environment and Health Coalition for responsible air transport" ("Coalition environnement et santé pour un transport aérien responsable" / CESAR) created in September 2016 by 20 like-minded Swiss associations and organisations. In March 2017 she became one of two co-presidents of the CIVIVA, a national organisation which makes arrangements for an extended period of alternative public service ("Service civil" / "Zivildienst") to be performed by male citizens unwilling, for reasons of conscience, to undertake the normal terms of (otherwise compulsory) military service. Since May 2018 she has also served as president for the Swiss section of the Society for Threatened Peoples which emerged in 1970 from the Hamburg-based "Aktion Biafra-Hilfe" movement.

== Personal life ==
Mazzone is in a relationship with Christoph Lenz, originally from Schaffhausen. They have two children.

She is a dual citizen of Switzerland and Italy.
