= Cosmological phase transition =

Phase transition for the whole universe

A cosmological phase transition is an overall change in the state of matter across the whole universe. The success of the Big Bang model led researchers to conjecture possible cosmological phase transitions taking place in the very early universe, at a time when it was much hotter and denser than today.

Any cosmological phase transition may have left signals which are observable today, even if it took place in the first moments after the Big Bang, when the universe was opaque to light.

== Character ==
The Standard Model of particle physics, parameterized by values measured in laboratories, can be used to predict the nature of cosmic phase transitions. A system in the ground state at a high temperature changes as the temperature drops due to expansion of the universe. A new ground state may become favorable and a transition between the states is a phase transition.

A phase transition can be related to a difference in symmetry between the two states. For example liquid is isotropic but solid water, ice, has directions with different properties. The two states have different energy: ice has less energy than liquid water. A system like an iron bar being cooled below its Curie temperature can have two states at the same lower energy with electron magnetic moments aligned in opposite directions. Above the Curie temperature the bar is not magnetic corresponding to isotropic moments; below its magnetic properties have two different values corresponding to inversion symmetry. The process is called spontaneous symmetry breaking.

=== Transition order ===
Phase transitions can be categorised by their order. Transitions which are first order proceed via bubble nucleation and release latent heat as the bubbles expand.

As the universe cooled after the hot Big Bang, such a phase transition would have released huge amounts of energy, both as heat and as the kinetic energy of growing bubbles. In a strongly first-order phase transition, the bubble walls may even grow at near the speed of light. This, in turn, would lead to the production of a stochastic background of gravitational waves. Experiments such as NANOGrav and LISA may be sensitive to this signal.

Shown below are two snapshots from simulations of the evolution of a first-order cosmological phase transition. Bubbles first nucleate, then expand and collide, eventually converting the universe from one phase to another.

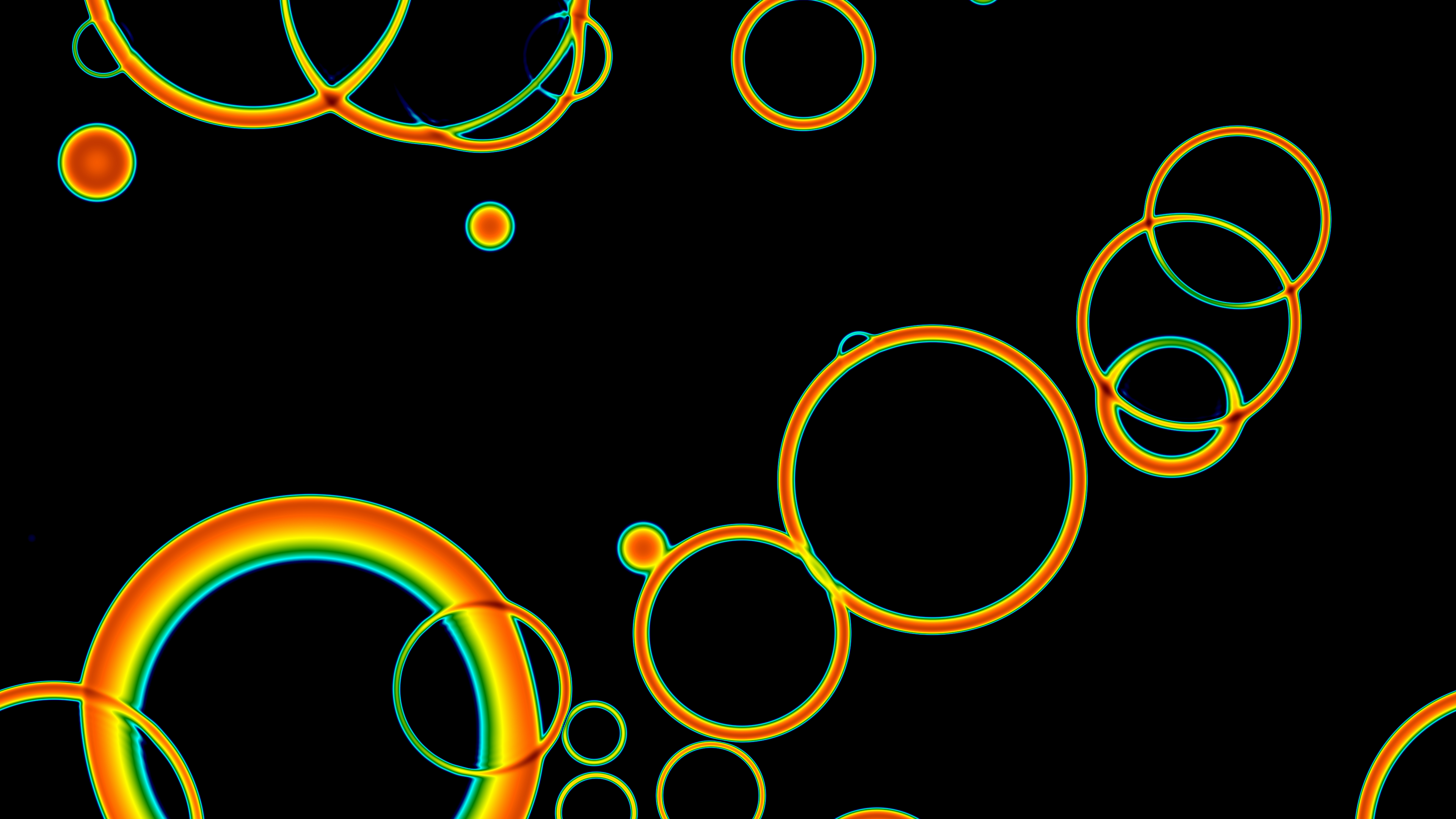
Earlier stages: the first bubbles nucleate and expand.

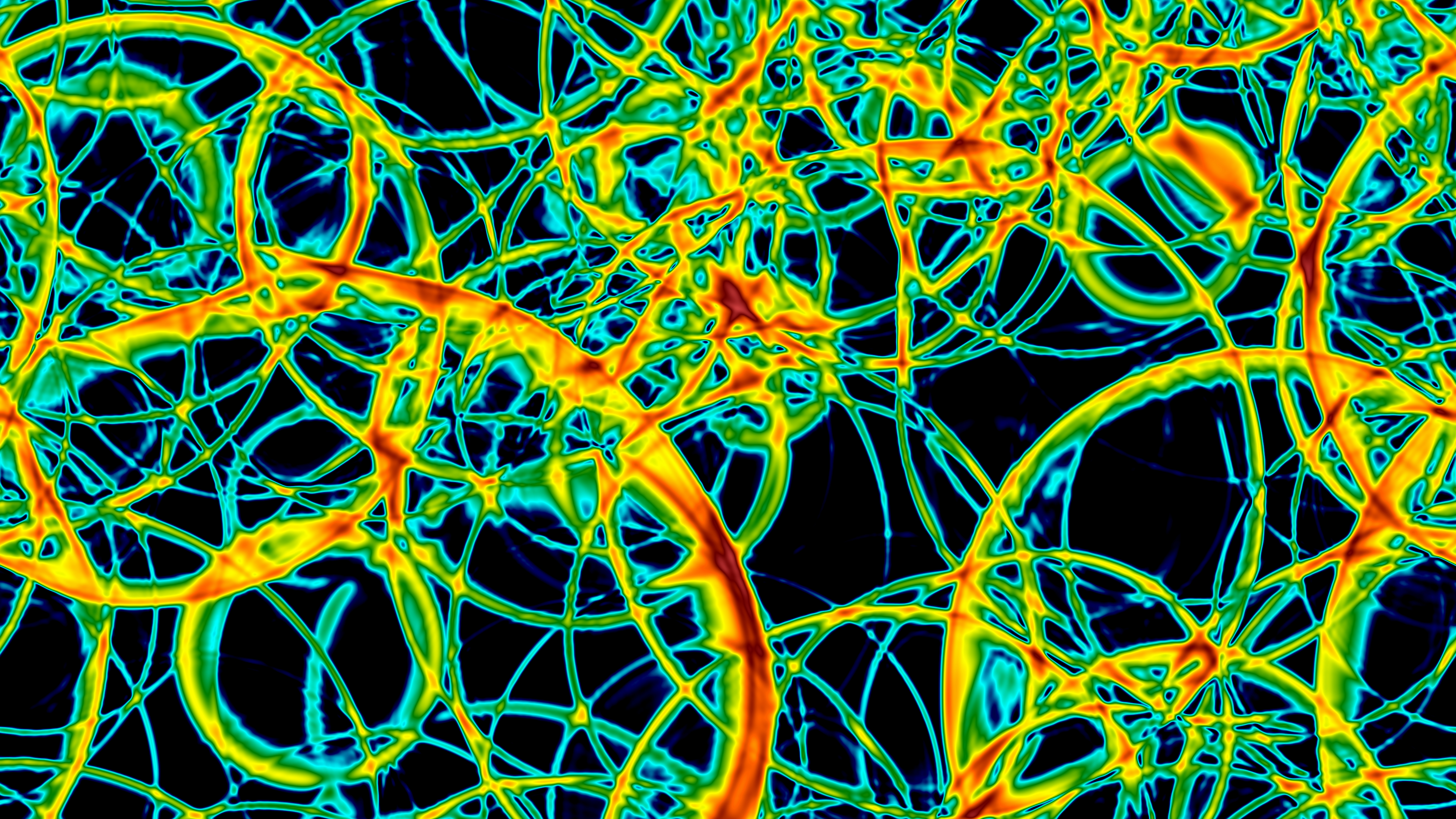
Later stages: overlapping bubble collisions.

Second order transitions are continuous rather than abrupt and are less likely to leave observable imprints in cosmic structures.

== Within the Standard Model ==
The Standard Model of particle physics contains three fundamental forces, the electromagnetic force, the weak force and the strong force. Shortly after the Big Bang, the extremely high temperatures may have modified the character of these forces. While these three forces act differently today, it has been conjectured that they may have been unified in the high temperatures of the early universe.

=== QCD phase transition ===
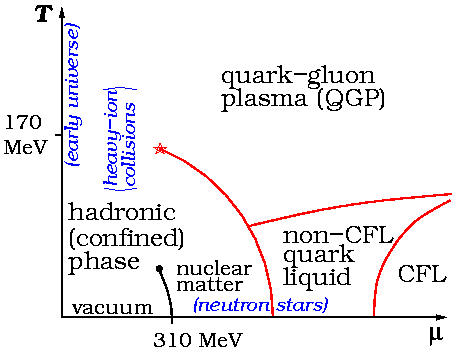
Conjectured form of the phase diagram of QCD matter, with temperature on the vertical axis and quark chemical potential on the horizontal axis, both in mega-electron volts.

The strong force binds together quarks into protons and neutrons, in a phenomenon known as color confinement. However, at sufficiently high temperatures, protons and neutrons disassociate into free quarks. This phase transition is also called the quark–hadron transition. Studies of this transition based on lattice QCD have demonstrated that it would have taken place at a temperature of approximately 155 MeV, and would have been a smooth crossover transition. In the early universe the chemical potential of baryons is assumed to be near zero and the transition near 170MeV converts a quark-gluon plasma to a hadron gas.

This conclusion assumes the simplest scenario at the time of the transition, and first- or second-order transitions are possible in the presence of a quark, baryon or neutrino chemical potential, or strong magnetic fields.

=== Electroweak phase transition ===
The electroweak phase transition marks the moment when the Higgs mechanism breaks the $SU(2)\otimes U(1)$ symmetry of the Standard model. Lattice studies of the electroweak model have found the transition to be a smooth crossover, taking place at a temperature of 159.5 ± 1.5 GeV.

The conclusion that the transition is a crossover assumes the minimal scenario, and is modified by the presence of additional fields or particles. Particle physics models which account for dark matter or which lead to successful baryogenesis may predict a strongly first-order electroweak phase transition. The electroweak baryogenesis model may explain the baryon asymmetry in the universe, the observation that the amount of matter vastly exceeds the amount of antimatter.

== Beyond the Standard Model ==
If the three forces of the Standard Model are unified in a Grand Unified Theory, then there would have been a cosmological phase transition at even higher temperatures, corresponding to the moment when the forces first separated out. A GUT transition that breaks this hypothetical unified state into the Standard model's $SU(3)\otimes SU(2)\otimes U(1)$ symmetry may be responsible for the observed excess of matter over antimatter. Cosmological phase transitions may also have taken place in a dark or hidden sector, amongst particles and fields that are only very weakly coupled to visible matter.

== Observational consequences ==
Among the ways that cosmological phase transitions can have measurable consequences are the production of primordial gravitational waves and the prediction of the baryon asymmetry. Adequate confirmation has not yet been achieved.

== See also ==
- Timeline of the early universe
- Chronology of the universe
- Phase transition
- Physics beyond the Standard Model
