= Strange B meson =

Meson that oscillates between matter and antimatter

B_{s} meson
- The quark structure of the strange B meson. The color assignment of individual quarks is arbitrary, but the net color charge must be zero. Forces between quarks are mediated by gluons.
- Composition: b̅s
- Statistics: Bosonic
- Family: Mesons
- Interactions: Strong, Weak, Gravitational, Electromagnetic
- Antiparticle: B̅_{s} (bs̅)
- Mass: 5366.3±0.6 MeV/c^{2}
- Mean lifetime: 1.470+0.027 −0.026×10^{−12} s
- Decays into: See B^{0}_{s} decay modes
- Electric charge: 0 e
- Spin: 0
- Strangeness: -1
- Bottomness: +1
- Isospin: 0
- Parity: -1

The B_{s} meson is a type of unstable subatomic particle known as a meson. It is notable for its observed ability to spontaneously switch into its own antiparticle and back, a rare phenomenon known as particle oscillation.

Because the properties of this oscillation and the particle's other rare decays are very precisely predicted by the Standard Model of particle physics, the strange B meson is of significant interest to scientists. Experiments at facilities like Fermilab and the Large Hadron Collider study the particle to test the limits of the Standard Model and search for new physics. The strange B meson is composed of two elementary particles: a bottom antiquark and a strange quark.

== B–B oscillations ==
Strange B mesons are noted for their ability to oscillate between matter and antimatter via a box-diagram with Δm_{s} = 17.77 ± 0.10 (stat) ± 0.07 (syst) ps^{−1} measured by CDF experiment at Fermilab. That is, a meson composed of a bottom quark and strange antiquark, the strange B̅ meson, can spontaneously change into an bottom antiquark and strange quark pair, the strange B meson, and vice versa.

On 25 September 2006, Fermilab announced that they had claimed discovery of previously-only-theorized B_{s} meson oscillation. According to Fermilab's press release:

This first major discovery of Run 2 continues the tradition of particle physics discoveries at Fermilab, where the bottom (1977) and top (1995) quarks were discovered. Surprisingly, the bizarre behavior of the B_s (pronounced "B sub s") mesons is actually predicted by the Standard Model of fundamental particles and forces. The discovery of this oscillatory behavior is thus another reinforcement of the Standard Model's durability... CDF physicists have previously measured the rate of the matter-antimatter transitions for the B_s meson, which consists of the heavy bottom quark bound by the strong nuclear interaction to a strange antiquark. Now they have achieved the standard for a discovery in the field of particle physics, where the probability for a false observation must be proven to be less than about 5 in 10 million (5/10,000,000). For CDF's result the probability is even smaller, at 8 in 100 million (8/100,000,000).

Ronald Kotulak, writing for the Chicago Tribune, called the particle "bizarre" and stated that the meson "may open the door to a new era of physics" with its proven interactions with the "spooky realm of antimatter".

Better understanding of the meson is one of the main objectives of the LHCb experiment conducted at the Large Hadron Collider. On 24 April 2013, CERN physicists in the LHCb collaboration announced that they had observed CP violation in the decay of strange B mesons for the first time. Scientists found the B_{s} meson decaying into two muons for the first time, with Large Hadron Collider experiments casting doubt on the scientific theory of supersymmetry.

CERN physicist Tara Shears described the CP violation observations as "verification of the validity of the Standard Model of physics".

== Rare decays ==
The rare decays of the B_{s} meson are an important test of the Standard Model. The branching fraction of the strange b-meson to a pair of muons is very precisely predicted with a value of Br(B_{s}→ μ^{+}μ^{−})_{SM} = (3.66 ± 0.23) × 10^{−9}. Any variation from this rate would indicate possible physics beyond the Standard Model, such as supersymmetry. The first definitive measurement was made from a combination of LHCb and CMS experiment data:

$Br(B_s \rightarrow \mu^+\mu^-) = 2.8^{+0.7}_{-0.6} \times 10^{-9}$

This result is compatible with the Standard Model and set limits on possible extensions.

== See also ==
- B meson
- B–B̅ oscillation
