= Grand unification epoch =

Extremely short period of the early universe

In physical cosmology, the grand unification epoch is a poorly understood period in the evolution of the early universe following the Planck epoch and preceding inflation. This places it between about 10^{−43} seconds after the Big Bang and 10^{−35} seconds, when the temperature of the universe was comparable to the characteristic temperatures of grand unified theories. However, these theories have not been successful in producing quantitative agreement with the results of modern astrophysical observations.

If the grand unification energy is taken to be 10^{15} GeV, this corresponds to temperatures higher than 10^{27} K. During this period, three of the four fundamental interactions—electromagnetism, the strong interaction, and the weak interaction—were unified as the electronuclear force. Gravity had separated from the electronuclear force at the end of the Planck era. During the grand unification epoch, physical characteristics such as mass, charge, flavour and colour charge were meaningless.

The grand unification epoch ended at approximately 10^{−36} seconds after the Big Bang. At this point several key events took place. The strong force separated from the other fundamental forces. It is possible that some part of this decay process violated the conservation of baryon number and gave rise to a small excess of matter over antimatter (see baryogenesis). This phase transition is also thought to have triggered the process of cosmic inflation that dominated the development of the universe during the following inflationary epoch.

== See also ==
- Big Bang
- Chronology of the universe
- Ultimate fate of the universe
