= CPLEAR experiment =

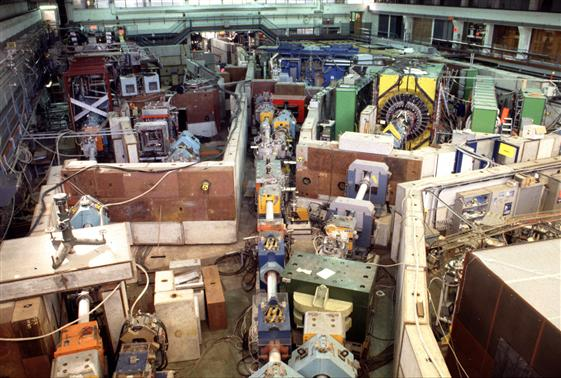
Low Energy Antiproton Ring experimental area.

The CPLEAR experiment used the antiproton beam of the LEAR facility – Low-Energy Antiproton Ring which operated at CERN from 1982 to 1996 – to produce neutral kaons through proton-antiproton annihilation in order to study CP, T and CPT violation in the neutral kaon system.

== Background ==
According to the theory of the Big Bang, matter and antimatter would have existed in the same amount at the beginning of the Universe. If this was true, particles and antiparticles would have annihilated each other, creating photons, and thus the Universe would have been only compounded by light (one particle of matter for 10^{18} photons). However, only matter has remained and at a rate of one billion times more particles than expected. What happened then, for the antimatter to disappear in favor of matter? A possible answer to this question is baryogenesis, the hypothetical physical process that took place during the early universe that produced baryonic asymmetry, i.e. the imbalance of matter (baryons) and antimatter (antibaryons) in the observed universe. However, baryogenesis is only possible under the following conditions proposed by Andrei Sakharov in 1967:

- Baryon number $B$ violation.
- C-symmetry and CP-symmetry violation.
- Interactions out of thermal equilibrium.

The first experimental test of CP violation came in 1964 with the Fitch-Cronin experiment. The experiment involved particles called neutral K-mesons, which fortuitously have the properties needed to test CP. First, as mesons, they're a combination of a quark and an anti-quark, in this case, down and antistrange, or anti-down and strange. Second, the two different particles have different CP values and different decay modes: K_{1} has CP = +1 and decays into two pions; K_{2} has CP = −1 and decays into three. Because decays with larger changes in mass occur more readily, the K_{1} decay happens 100 times faster than the K_{2} decay. This means that a sufficiently long beam of neutral Kaons will become arbitrarily pure K_{2} after a sufficient amount of time. The Fitch-Cronin experiment exploits this. If all the K_{1}s are allowed to decay out of a beam of mixed Kaons, only K_{2} decays should be observed. If any K_{1} decays are found, it means that a K_{2} flipped to a K_{1}, and the CP for the particles flipped from −1 to +1, and CP wasn't conserved. The experiment resulted in an excess of 45±9 events around cos(θ) = 1 in the correct mass range for 2-pion decays. This means that for every decay of K_{2} into three pions, there are (2.0±0.4)×10-3 decays into two pions. Because of this, neutral K mesons violate CP. The study of the ratio of neutral kaon and neutral anti-kaons production is thus an efficient tool to understand what happened in the early Universe that promoted the production of matter.

== The experiment ==
CPLEAR is a collaboration of about 100 scientists, coming from 17 institutions from 9 different countries. Accepted in 1985, the experiment took data from 1990 until 1996. Its main aim was to study CP, T and CPT symmetries in the neutral kaon system.

In addition, CPLEAR performed measurements about quantum coherence of wave functions, Bose-Einstein correlations in multi-pion states, regeneration of the short-lived kaon component in the matter, the Einstein-Rosen-Podolsky paradox using entangled neutral-kaon pair states and the equivalence principle of general relativity.

=== Facility description ===
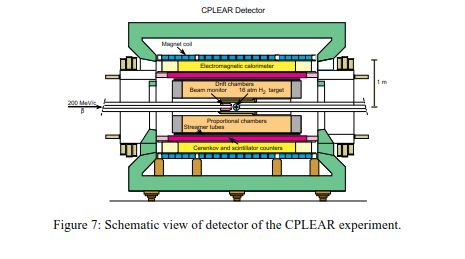
A scheme of the CPLEAR detector.

The CPLEAR detector was able to determine the locations, the momenta and the charges of the tracks at the production of the neutral kaon and at its decay, thus visualizing the complete event.

Strangeness is not conserved under weak interactions, meaning that under weak interactions a K^{0} can transform into a K̅^{0} and vice versa. To study the asymmetries between K^{0} and K̅^{0} decay rates in the various final states f (f = π^{+}π^{−}, π^{0}π^{0}, π^{+}π^{−}π^{0}, π^{0}π^{0}π^{+}, πlν), the CPLEAR collaboration used the fact that the strangeness of kaons is tagged by the charge of the accompanying kaon. Time-reversal invariance would imply that all details of one of the transformations could be deducible from the other one, i.e. the probability for a kaon to oscillate into an anti-kaon would be equal to the one for the reverse process. The measurement of these probabilities required the knowledge of the strangeness of a kaon at two different times of its life. Since the strangeness of the kaon is given by the charge of the accompanying kaon, and thus be known for each event, it was observed that this symmetry was not respected, thereby proving the T violation in neutral kaon systems under weak interaction.

The neutral kaons are initially produced in the annihilation channels

- p̅p → π^{+} K^{−} K^{0}
- p̅p → π^{−} K^{+} K̅^{0}

which happen when the 10^{6} anti-protons per second beam coming from the LEAR facility is stopped by a highly pressurized hydrogen gas target. The low momentum of the antiprotons and the high pressure allowed to keep the size of the stopping region small in the detector. Since the proton-antiproton reaction happens at rest, the particles are produced isotropically, and as a consequence, the detector has to have a near-4π symmetry. The whole detector was embedded in a 3.6 m long and 2 m diameter warm solenoidal magnet providing a 0.44 T uniform magnetic field.

The antiprotons were stopped using a pressurized hydrogen gas target. A hydrogen gas target was used instead of liquid hydrogen to minimize the amount of matter in the decay volume. The target initially had a radius of 7 cm and subjected to a pressure of 16 bar. Changed in 1994, its radius became equal to 1.1 cm, under a 27 bar pressure.

=== Layout of the detector ===
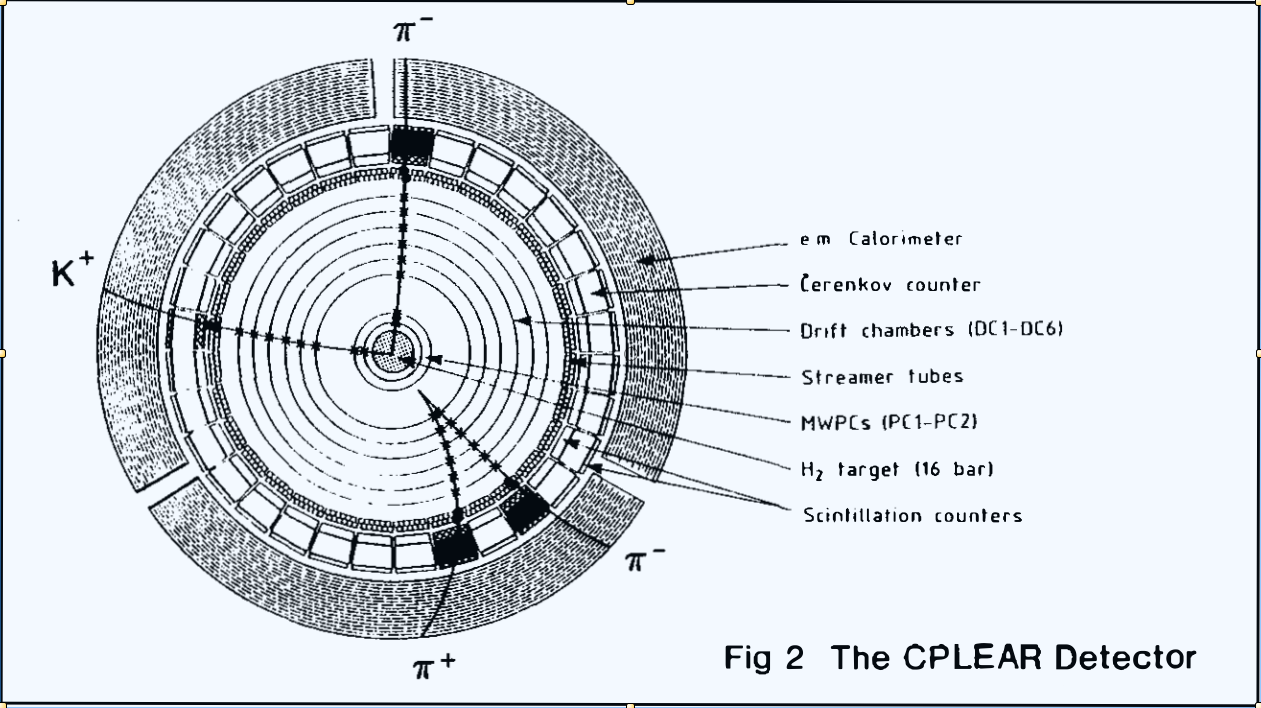
The CPLEAR detector

The detector had to fulfill the specific requirements of the experiment and thus had to be able to:

- do an efficient kaon identification
- select the annihilation channels mentioned in Facility description among the very large number of multi-pions annihilation channels
- distinguish between the different neutral-kaon decay channels
- measure the decay proper time
- acquire a large number of statistics, and for this, it had to have both a high rate capability and a large geometrical coverage

Cylindrical tracking detectors together with a solenoid field were used to determine the charge signs, momenta and positions of the charged particles. They were followed by the particle identification detector (PID) whose role was to identify the charged kaon. It was compounded by a Cherenkov detector, which carried out the kaon-pion separation; and scintillators, measuring the energy loss and the time of flight of the charged particles. It was also used for the electron-pion separation. The detection of photons produced in π^{0} decays was performed by ECAL, an outermost lead/gas sampling calorimeter, complementary to the PID by separating pions and electrons at higher momenta. Finally, hardwired processors (HWK) were used to analyze and select the events in a few microseconds, deleting the unwanted ones, by providing a full event reconstruction with sufficient precision.
