= BTeV experiment =

High-energy particle physics experiment

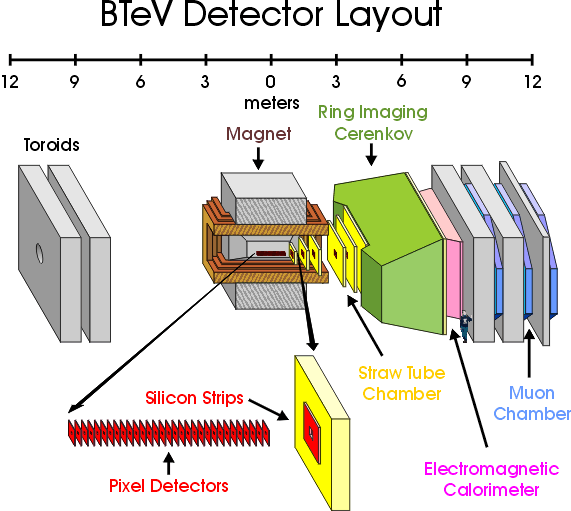
Schematics of the apparatus

The BTeV experiment — for B meson TeV (teraelectronvolt) — was an experiment in high-energy particle physics designed to challenge the Standard Model explanation of CP violation, mixing and rare decays of bottom and charm quark states. The Standard Model has been the baseline particle physics theory for several decades and BTeV aimed to find out what lies beyond the Standard Model. In doing so, the BTeV results could have contributed to shed light on phenomena associated with the early universe such as why the universe is made up of matter and not anti-matter.

The BTeV Collaboration was a group of about 170 physicists drawn from more than 30 universities and physics institutes from Belarus, Canada, China, Italy, Russia, and the United States of America. The BTeV experiment was designed to utilize the Tevatron proton-antiproton collider at the Fermi National Accelerator Laboratory, located in the far west suburbs of Chicago, Illinois in the USA. The experiment was scheduled to start in 2006, followed by commissioning in 2008, and data-taking in 2009.

The BTeV Project was terminated by the United States Department of Energy on 2005-02-07 after being removed from the President's Budget for the 2006 fiscal year.
