= Neutral particle oscillation =

Quantum mechanical transmutation of neutral particles

In particle physics, neutral particle oscillation is the transmutation of a particle with zero electric charge into another neutral particle due to a change of a non-zero internal quantum number, via an interaction that does not conserve that quantum number. Neutral particle oscillations were first investigated in 1954 by Murray Gell-mann and Abraham Pais.

For example, a neutron cannot transmute into an antineutron as that would violate the conservation of baryon number. But in those hypothetical extensions of the Standard Model which include interactions that do not strictly conserve baryon number, neutron–antineutron oscillations are predicted to occur.

Such oscillations do regularly occur for other neutral particles, and are classified into two types:

- Particle–antiparticle oscillation (for example, K^{0} ⇄ K̅^{0} oscillation, B^{0} ⇄ B̅^{0} oscillation, D^{0} ⇄ D̅^{0} oscillation).
- Flavor oscillation (for example, ν_{e} ⇄ ν_{μ} ⇄ ν_{τ} oscillation).

In those cases where the particles decay to some final product, then the system is not purely oscillatory, and an interference between oscillation and decay is observed.

== History and motivation ==
=== CP violation ===
After the striking evidence for parity violation provided by Wu et al. in 1957, it was assumed that CP (charge conjugation-parity) is the symmetry that is conserved. However, in 1964 Cronin and Fitch reported CP violation in the neutral kaon system. They observed the long-lived K_{L} (with CP = −1) undergoing decays into two pions (with CP = [−1] × [−1] = +1) thereby violating CP conservation.

In 2001, CP violation in the B^{0} ⇄ B̅^{0} system was confirmed by the BaBar and the Belle experiments. Direct CP violation in the B^{0} ⇄ B̅^{0} system was reported by both the labs by 2005.

The K^{0} ⇄ K̅^{0} and the B^{0} ⇄ B̅^{0} systems can be studied as two state systems, considering the particle and its antiparticle as two states of a single particle.

=== Solar neutrino problem ===
The pp chain in the sun produces an abundance of ν_{e}. In 1968, R. Davis et al. first reported the results of the Homestake experiment. Also known as the Davis experiment, it used a huge tank of perchloroethylene in Homestake mine (it was deep underground to eliminate background from cosmic rays), South Dakota. Chlorine nuclei in the perchloroethylene absorb ν_{e} to produce argon via the reaction

$$\mathrm{\nu_e + {{}^{37}_{17}Cl} \rightarrow {{}^{37}_{18}}Ar + e^-}$$,

which is essentially

$\mathrm{\nu_e + n \to p + e^-}$.

The experiment collected argon for several months. Because the neutrino interacts very weakly, only about one argon atom was collected every two days. The total accumulation was about one third of Bahcall's theoretical prediction.

In 1968, Bruno Pontecorvo showed that if neutrinos are not considered massless, then ν_{e} (produced in the sun) can transform into some other neutrino species (ν_{μ} or ν_{τ}), to which Homestake detector was insensitive. This explained the deficit in the results of the Homestake experiment. The final confirmation of this solution to the solar neutrino problem was provided in April 2002 by the SNO (Sudbury Neutrino Observatory) collaboration, which measured both ν_{e} flux and the total neutrino flux.

This 'oscillation' between the neutrino species can first be studied considering any two, and then generalized to the three known flavors.

== Description as a two-state system ==
=== Special case that only considers mixing ===
Caution: "mixing" discussed in this article is not the type obtained from mixed quantum states. Rather, "mixing" here refers to the superposition of "pure state" energy (mass) eigenstates, prescribed by a "mixing matrix" (e.g. the CKM or PMNS matricies).

Let $H_0$ be the Hamiltonian of the two-state system, and $\left| 1 \right\rangle$ and $\left| 2 \right\rangle$ be its orthonormal eigenvectors with eigenvalues $E_1$ and $E_2$ respectively.

Let $\left| \Psi( t ) \right\rangle$ be the state of the system at time $t$.

If the system starts as an energy eigenstate of $H_0$, for example, say

$$\ \left| \Psi( 0 ) \right\rangle = \left| 1 \right\rangle\ ,$$

then the time evolved state, which is the solution of the Schrödinger equation

$\hat H_0\left|\Psi( t )\right\rangle\ =\ i \hbar\frac{\partial}{\partial t}\left|\Psi\left( t \right) \right\rangle\$ (1)

will be

$$\ \left| \Psi( t ) \right\rangle\ =\ \left| 1 \right\rangle e^{-i\ \frac{E_1 t}{\hbar}}\$$

But this is physically same as $\ \left| 1 \right\rangle\ ,$ since the exponential term is just a phase factor: It does not produce an observable new state. In other words, energy eigenstates are stationary eigenstates, that is, they do not yield observably distinct new states under time evolution.

Define $\left\{ \left\vert 1 \right\rangle , \left\vert 2 \right\rangle \right\}$ to be a basis in which the unperturbed Hamiltonian operator, $H_0$, is diagonal:

$$\ H_0 = \begin{pmatrix}
E_1 & 0 \\
0 & E_2 \\
\end{pmatrix}\ =\ E_1\ \left| 1 \right\rangle\ +\ E_2\ \left| 2 \right\rangle
\$$

It can be shown, that oscillation between states will occur if and only if off-diagonal terms of the Hamiltonian are not zero.

Hence let us introduce a general perturbation $W$ imposed on $H_0$ such that the resultant Hamiltonian $H$ is still Hermitian. Then

$$W = \begin{pmatrix}
W_{11}   & W_{12} \\
W_{12}^* & W_{22} \\
\end{pmatrix}\$$

where $W_{11}, W_{22} \in \mathbb{R}$ and $W_{12} \in \mathbb{C}$ and

$$\ H = H_0 + W = \begin{pmatrix}
E_1 + W_{11} &         W_{12} \\
W_{12}^* &   E_2 + W_{22} \\
\end{pmatrix}\$$
(2)

The eigenvalues of the perturbed Hamiltonian, $H$, then change to $E_+$ and $E_-$, where

$E_\pm = \frac{ 1 }{\ 2\ } \left[ E_1 + W_{11} + E_2 + W_{22} \pm \sqrt{{\left(E_1 + W_{11} - E_{^2} - W_{22}\right)}^2 + 4 \left| W_{12} \right|^2} \right]$ (3)

Since $H$ is a general Hamiltonian matrix, it can be written as

$$H = \sum\limits_{j=0}^3 a_j \sigma_j = a_0 \sigma_0 + H'$$

where

$\ H' = \vec{a}\cdot\vec{\sigma} = \left| a \right|\hat{n}\cdot\vec{\sigma} ,$

$\ \hat{n}\$ is a real unit vector in 3 dimensions in the direction of $\vec{a}$, ${{{1}}}$, and

$$\begin{align}
\sigma_0 &= ~I~ = ~\;\begin{pmatrix}
1 & ~\;0 \\
0 & ~\;1 \\
\end{pmatrix}\ , \\
\sigma_1 &= \sigma_x = ~\;\begin{pmatrix}
0 & ~\;1 \\
1 & ~\;0 \\
\end{pmatrix}\ , \\
\sigma_2 &= \sigma_y = i\ \begin{pmatrix}
0 &   -1 \\
1 & ~\;0 \\
\end{pmatrix}\ , \\
\sigma_3 &= \sigma_z = ~\;\begin{pmatrix}
1 &  ~\;0 \\
0 &    -1 \\
\end{pmatrix}
\end{align}\$$

are the Pauli spin matrices.

The following two results are clear:

- $\left[H, H'\right] = 0$

Proof
$$\begin{align}
HH'\ &=\ a_0 \sigma_0 H' + H'H'\ =\ a_0 \sigma_0 + {H'}^2 \\
H'H\ &=\ a_0 H' \sigma_0 + H'H'\ =\ a_0 \sigma_0 + {H'}^2 \\
\end{align}$$
therefore
$\left[ H, H' \right] \equiv HH' - H'H = 0$

- ${H'}^2 = I$

Proof
$$\begin{align}
{H'}^2
&= \sum\limits_{j=1}^3 {n_j \sigma_j} \sum\limits_{k=1}^3 {n_k \sigma_k}
= \sum\limits_{j,k=1}^3 {n_j n_k \sigma_j \sigma_k} \\
&= \sum\limits_{j,k=1}^3 {n_j n_k \left( \delta_{jk} I + i\sum\limits_{\ell=1}^3 {\varepsilon_{jk\ell}\sigma_\ell} \right)} \\
&= \left( \sum\limits_{j=1}^3 {n_j}^2 \right)I + i\sum\limits_{\ell=1}^3 {\sigma_l \sum\limits_{j,k=1}^3 \varepsilon_{jk\ell}} \\
&= I \\
\end{align}$$
where the following results have been used:
- $\sigma_j \sigma_k = \delta_{jk}\ I + i\ \sum\limits_{\ell=1}^3 {\varepsilon_{jk\ell} \sigma_\ell}$
- $\hat{n}$ is a unit vector and hence $\sum\limits_{j=1}^3{{n_j}^2} = \left| \hat{n} \right|^2 = 1$
- The Levi-Civita symbol $\varepsilon_{jk\ell}$ is antisymmetric in any two of its indices ($j$ and $k$ in this case) and hence ${{{1}}}$.

With the following parametrization (this parametrization helps as it normalizes the eigenvectors and also introduces an arbitrary phase $\phi$ making the eigenvectors most general)

$$\hat{n} = \left(\ \sin\theta \cos\phi\ ,\ \sin\theta \sin\phi\ ,\ \cos\theta\ \right)$$

and using the above pair of results the orthonormal eigenvectors of $H'$ and consequently those of $H$ are obtained as

$$\begin{align}
\left| + \right\rangle\ &=
\ \begin{pmatrix}
\; ~\; \cos\tfrac{\theta}{2}\; e^{-i\frac{\phi}{2}} \\
\; ~\; \sin\tfrac{\theta}{2}\; e^{+i\frac{\phi}{2}} \\
\end{pmatrix}\ \equiv
~~~\; \cos\tfrac{\theta}{2}\; e^{-i\frac{\phi}{2}}\ \left| 1 \right\rangle\ +
~\; \sin\tfrac{\theta}{2}\; e^{+i\frac{\phi}{2}}\ \left| 2 \right\rangle \\
\left| - \right\rangle\ &=
\ \begin{pmatrix}
-  \sin\frac{\theta}{2}\; e^{+i\frac{\phi}{2}} \\
~ \cos\frac{\theta}{2}\; e^{-i\frac{\phi}{2}} \\
\end{pmatrix}\ \equiv
\ - \sin\frac{\theta}{2}\; e^{-i\frac{\phi}{2}}\ \left| 1 \right\rangle\ +
~ \cos\frac{\theta}{2}\; e^{+i\frac{\phi}{2}}\ \left| 2 \right\rangle \\
\end{align}$$
(4)

where
$\tan\theta = \frac{2\left| W_{12} \right|}{E_1 + W_{11} - E_2 - W_{22}}$

and
$W_{12} = \left| W_{12} \right| e^{i\phi}$

Writing the eigenvectors of $H_0$ in terms of those of $H$ we get

$$\begin{align}
\left|\ 1\ \right\rangle\ &=
\ e^{i\frac{\phi}{2}} \left( \cos\tfrac{\theta}{2}\left| + \right\rangle - \sin\tfrac{\theta}{2}\left| - \right\rangle \right) \\
\left|\ 2\ \right\rangle\ &=
\ e^{-i\frac{\phi}{2}} \left( \sin\tfrac{\theta }{2}\left| + \right\rangle + \cos\tfrac{\theta}{2}\left| - \right\rangle \right) \\
\end{align}$$
(5)

Now if the particle starts out as an eigenstate of $H_0$ (say, $\left\vert 1 \right\rangle$), that is

$$\left|\ \Psi( 0 )\ \right\rangle\ =\ \left| 1 \right\rangle$$

then under time evolution we get

$$\left|\ \Psi( t )\ \right\rangle\ =\ e^{i\ \frac{\phi}{2}} \left(
\cos\tfrac{\theta}{2}\ \left| + \right\rangle\ e^{-i\ \frac{E_+ t}{\hbar}} -
\sin\tfrac{\theta}{2}\ \left| - \right\rangle\ e^{-i\ \frac{E_- t}{\hbar}}
\right)$$

which unlike the previous case, is distinctly different from $\left\vert 1 \right\rangle$.

We can then obtain the probability of finding the system in state $\left| 2 \right\rangle$ at time $t$ as

$$\begin{align}
P_{21}\!( t )
&= \Bigl|\ \left\langle\ 2\ |\ \Psi(t)\ \right\rangle\ \Bigr|^2 =
\sin^2\!\theta\ \sin^2\!\!\left( \frac{\ E_+ - E_-\ }{\ 2\ \hbar\ }\ t\ \right) \\
&= \frac
{4\left| W_{12} \right|^2}
{4\left| W_{12} \right|^2 + \left( E_1 - E_2 \right)^2}
\sin^2\!\!\left(
\ \frac{\ \sqrt{4\ \left| W_{12} \right|^2 + \left( E_1 - E_2 \right)^2\ }\ }{\ 2\ \hbar\ }\ t
\ \right) \\
\end{align}$$
(6)

which is called Rabi's formula. Hence, starting from one eigenstate of the unperturbed Hamiltonian $H_0$, the state of the system oscillates between the eigenstates of $H_0$ with a frequency (known as Rabi frequency),

$\, \omega = \frac{\ E_1 - E_2\ }{\ 2\ \hbar\ } = \frac{\ \sqrt{4\left| W_{12} \right|^2 + \left( E_1 - E_2 \right)^2\ }\ }{\ 2\ \hbar\ } \$ (7)

From equation (6), for $P_{21}\!(t)$, we can conclude that oscillation will exist only if $\left\vert W_{12} \right\vert^2 \ne 0$. So $\ W_{12}\$ is known as the coupling term as it connects the two eigenstates of the unperturbed Hamiltonian $H_0$ and thereby facilitates oscillation between the two.

Oscillation will also cease if the eigenvalues of the perturbed Hamiltonian $H$ are degenerate, i.e. $E_+ = E_-$. But this is a trivial case as in such a situation, the perturbation itself vanishes and $H$ takes the form (diagonal) of $H_0$ and we're back to square one.

Hence, the necessary conditions for oscillation are:

- Non-zero coupling, i.e. $\left\vert W_{12} \right\vert^2 \ne 0$.
- Non-degenerate eigenvalues of the perturbed Hamiltonian $H$, i.e. $E_+ \ne E_-$.

=== General case: considering mixing and decay ===
If the particle(s) under consideration undergoes decay, then the Hamiltonian describing the system is no longer Hermitian. Since any matrix can be written as a sum of its Hermitian and anti-Hermitian parts, $\ H\$ can be written as,

$$\ H\; =\; M - \frac{i}{2}\ \Gamma\; =\; \begin{pmatrix}
M_{11} & M_{12} \\
M_{12}^* & M_{11} \\
\end{pmatrix} - \frac{i}{2}\ \begin{pmatrix}
\Gamma_{11} & \Gamma_{12} \\
\Gamma_{12}^* & \Gamma_{11} \\
\end{pmatrix}
\$$

where
$$\ M = \begin{pmatrix}
M_{11} & M_{12} \\
M_{21} & M_{22} \\
\end{pmatrix}\$$
and
$$\ \Gamma = \begin{pmatrix}
\Gamma_{11} & \Gamma_{12} \\
\Gamma_{21} & \Gamma_{11} \\
\end{pmatrix}\$$

$\ M\$ and $\ \Gamma\$ are Hermitian. Hence $~~ M_{21} = M_{12}^* ~~$ and $~~ \Gamma_{21} = \Gamma_{12}^*\$

CPT conservation (symmetry) implies

$\ M_{22} = M_{11} ~~$ and $~~ \Gamma_{22} = \Gamma_{11}\$

Proof
Let $\ \Theta = CPT ~.$ Operator $\ \Theta\$ changes a particle to its antiparticle. That is

$\ \Theta \left| 1 \right\rangle = \left| 2 \right\rangle ~~$ and $~~ \Theta \left| 2 \right\rangle = \left| 1 \right\rangle\$

CPT conservation implies that the Hamiltonian $\ H\$ and hence $\ M\$ and $\ \Gamma\$ are invariant under the following transformation:

$\ \Theta^{-1} M \Theta = M ~~$ and $~~ \Theta^{-1}\Gamma\Theta = \Gamma\$

$\ \Theta\$ is an anti-Unitary operator and satisfies the relation

$$\ \Theta^\dagger\Theta = I\ ,$$

hence

$$\ M_{22} =
\left\langle 2 \right| M \left| 2 \right\rangle =
\left\langle 2 \right| \Theta^{-1} M\Theta \left| 2 \right\rangle =
\left\langle 2 \right| \Theta^\dagger M\Theta \left| 2 \right\rangle =
\left\langle 1 \right| M\left| 1 \right\rangle =
M_{11}
\$$

and similarly for the diagonal elements of $\ \Gamma ~.$

Hermiticity of $\ M\$ and $\ \Gamma\$ also implies that their diagonal elements are real.

The eigenvalues of $\ H\$ are

$$\ \begin{align}
\mu_\mathsf H &= M_{11} - \tfrac{i}{2}\Gamma_{11} + \tfrac{1}{2}\left( \Delta m - \frac{i}{2}\Delta\Gamma \right), \\
\mu_\mathsf L &= M_{11} - \tfrac{i}{2}\Gamma_{11} - \tfrac{1}{2}\left( \Delta m - \frac{i}{2}\Delta\Gamma \right)\end{align}\$$
(8)

where
$\ \Delta m\$ and $\ \Delta\Gamma\$ satisfy

$$\ \begin{align}
\left( \Delta m \right)^2 - \left( \frac{\Delta\Gamma}{2} \right)^2 &=
4\left| M_{12} \right|^2 - \left| \Gamma_{12} \right|^2\ , \\
\Delta m\Delta\Gamma &=
4\operatorname\mathcal{R_e}\left( M_{12} \Gamma_{12}^* \right)
\end{align}\$$

The suffixes stand for Heavy and Light respectively (by convention) and this implies that $\Delta m$ is positive.

The normalized eigenstates corresponding to $\mu_\mathsf L$ and $\mu_\mathsf H$ respectively, in the natural basis $\bigl\{ \left| P \right\rangle\ ,\ \left| \bar{P} \right\rangle \bigr\} ~\equiv~ \bigl\{\ (1, 0)\ ,\ (0, 1)\ \bigr\}$ are

$$\ \begin{align}
\left| P_\mathsf L \right\rangle\ &=\ p\ \left| P \right\rangle\ +\ q\left|\ \bar{P} \right\rangle \\
\left| P_\mathsf H \right\rangle\ &=\ p\ \left| P \right\rangle\ -\ q\left|\ \bar{P} \right\rangle
\end{align}\$$
(9)

where
$\left| p \right|^2 + \left| q \right|^2\ =\ 1$ and $\left( \frac{p}{q} \right)^2\ =\ \frac{\ M_{12}^*\ -\ \tfrac{i}{2}\Gamma_{12}^*\ }{\ M_{12}\ -\ \tfrac{i}{2}\Gamma_{12}\ }$

$p$ and $q$ are the mixing terms. Note that these eigenstates are no longer orthogonal.

Let the system start in the state $\left\vert P \right\rangle$.That is

$$\ \left|\ P( 0 )\ \right\rangle\ =
\ \left| P \right\rangle\ =
\ \frac{ 1 }{\ 2\ p\ }\ \Bigl(\ \left| P_\mathsf L \right\rangle\ +\ \left| P_\mathsf H \right\rangle\ \Bigr)
\$$

Under time evolution we then get

$$\ \left|\ P( t )\ \right\rangle\ =
\ \frac{ 1 }{\ 2\ p\ }\ \left(
\ \left| P_\mathsf L \right\rangle\ e^{-\tfrac{i}{\hbar}\ \left( m_L - \tfrac{i}{2}\gamma_L \right)\ t}\ +
\ \left| P_\mathsf H \right\rangle\ e^{-\tfrac{i}{\hbar}\ \left( m_H - \tfrac{i}{2}\gamma_H \right)\ t}
\ \right)\ =
\ g_+( t )\ \left| P \right\rangle\ -\ \frac{\ q\ }{ p }\ g_-( t )\ \left| \bar{P} \right\rangle
\$$

where
$\ g_\pm( t )\ = \ \frac{\ 1\ }{ 2 } \left( \ e^{-\tfrac{i}{\hbar}\ \left(\ m_\mathsf H\ -\ \tfrac{i}{2}\ \gamma_\mathsf H\ \right)\ t}\ \pm \ e^{-\tfrac{i}{\hbar}\ \left(\ m_\mathsf L\ -\ \tfrac{i}{2}\ \gamma_\mathsf L\ \right)\ t} \ \right) \$

Similarly, if the system starts in the state $\left| \bar{P} \right\rangle$, under time evolution we obtain

$$\left|\ \bar{P}(t)\ \right\rangle =
\frac{ 1 }{\ 2\ q\ }\left(
\left| P_\mathsf L \right\rangle\ e^{-\tfrac{i}{\hbar}\ \left( m_\mathsf L - \tfrac{i}{2}\gamma_\mathsf L \right)\ t} -
\left| P_\mathsf H \right\rangle\ e^{-\tfrac{i}{\hbar}\ \left( m_\mathsf H - \tfrac{i}{2}\gamma_\mathsf H \right)\ t}
\right)\ =
\ -\frac{ p }{\ q\ }\ g_-( t )\ \left| P \right\rangle\ +\ g_+( t )\ \left| \bar{P} \right\rangle$$

== CP violation as a consequence ==
If in a system $\left| P \right\rangle$ and $\left| {\bar{P}} \right\rangle$ represent CP conjugate states (i.e. particle-antiparticle) of one another (i.e. $CP\left| P \right\rangle = e^{i\delta} \left| \bar{P} \right\rangle$ and $CP\left| \bar{P} \right\rangle = e^{-i\delta} \left| P \right\rangle$), and certain other conditions are met, then CP violation can be observed as a result of this phenomenon. Depending on the condition, CP violation can be classified into three types:

=== CP violation through decay only ===
Consider the processes where $\left\{ \left| P \right\rangle, \left| \bar{P} \right\rangle \right\}$ decay to final states $\left\{ \left| f \right\rangle, \left| \bar{f} \right\rangle \right\}$, where the barred and the unbarred kets of each set are CP conjugates of one another.

The probability of $\left| P \right\rangle$ decaying to $\left| f \right\rangle$ is given by,

$$\wp_{P \to f} \left( t \right) =
\left| \left\langle f | P\left( t \right) \right\rangle \right|^2 =
\left| g_+ \left( t \right) A_f - \frac{q}{p} g_- \left( t \right) \bar{A}_f \right|^2$$,

and that of its CP conjugate process by,

$$\wp_{\bar{P} \to \bar{f}}\left( t \right) =
\left| \left\langle \bar{f} | \bar{P} \left( t \right) \right\rangle \right|^2 =
\left| g_+ \left( t \right) \bar{A}_\bar{f} - \frac{p}{q} g_- \left( t \right) A_\bar{f} \right|^2$$

where,
$$\begin{align}
A_f &= \left\langle f | P \right\rangle \\
\bar{A}_f &= \left\langle f | \bar{P} \right\rangle \\
A_\bar{f} &= \left\langle \bar{f} | P \right\rangle \\
\bar{A}_\bar{f} &= \left\langle \bar{f} | \bar{P} \right\rangle
\end{align}$$

If there is no CP violation due to mixing, then $\left| \frac{q}{p} \right| = 1$.

Now, the above two probabilities are unequal if

$\left| \frac{\bar{A}_\bar{f}}{A_f} \right| \ne 1$ and $\left| \frac{A_\bar{f}}{\bar{A_f}} \right| \ne 1$ (10)

Hence, the decay becomes a CP violating process as the probability of a decay and that of its CP conjugate process are not equal.

=== CP violation through mixing only ===
The probability (as a function of time) of observing $\left| \bar{P} \right\rangle$ starting from $\left| P \right\rangle$ is given by,

$$\wp_{P \to \bar{P}} \left( t \right) =
\left| \left\langle {\bar{P}} | P\left( t \right) \right\rangle \right|^2 =
\left| \frac{q}{p} g_- \left( t \right) \right|^2$$,

and that of its CP conjugate process by,

$$\wp_{\bar{P} \to P} \left( t \right) =
\left| \left\langle P | \bar{P}\left( t \right) \right\rangle \right|^2 =
\left| \frac{p}{q} g_- \left( t \right) \right|^2$$.

The above two probabilities are unequal if

$\left| \frac{q}{p} \right| \ne 1$ (11)

Hence, the particle-antiparticle oscillation becomes a CP violating process as the particle and its antiparticle (say, $\left| P \right\rangle$ and $\left| {\bar{P}} \right\rangle$ respectively) are no longer equivalent eigenstates of CP.

=== CP violation through mixing-decay interference ===
Let $\left| f \right\rangle$ be a final state (a CP eigenstate) that both $\left| P \right\rangle$ and $\left| \bar{P} \right\rangle$ can decay to. Then, the decay probabilities ($\ {\mathbb P}\$) are given by,

$$\begin{align}
\operatorname{\mathbb P}_{P \to f} \left( t \right)
&= \Bigl| \left\langle f | P( t ) \right\rangle \Bigr|^2 \\
&= \Bigl| A_f \Bigr|^2 \tfrac{1}{2} e^{-\gamma t} \left[
\ \left( 1 + \left| \lambda_f \right|^2 \right) \cosh\!\left( \tfrac{1}{2} \Delta\gamma t \right)
+ 2\ \operatorname\mathcal{R_e}\!\left\{\ \lambda_f\ \right\}\ \sinh\!\left( \tfrac{1}{2}\Delta\gamma t \right)
+ \left( 1 - \left| \lambda_f \right|^2 \right) \cos\!\left( \Delta mt \right)
+ 2\ \operatorname\mathcal{I_m}\!\left\{\ \lambda_f\ \right\}\ \sin\!\left( \Delta mt \right)
\ \right] \\
\end{align}$$

and,

$$\begin{align}
\operatorname{\mathbb P}_{\bar{P} \to f}( t )
&= \Bigl| \left\langle f | \bar{P}( t ) \right\rangle \Bigr|^2 \\
&= \Bigl| A_f \Bigr|^2 \left| \frac{p}{q} \right|^2 \tfrac{1}{2} e^{-\gamma t} \left[
\ \left( 1 + \left| \lambda_f \right|^2 \right) \cosh\!\left( \tfrac{1}{2}\Delta\gamma t \right)
+ 2\ \operatorname{\mathcal R_e}\!\left\{\ \lambda_f\ \right\}\ \sinh\!\left( \tfrac{1}{2}\Delta\gamma t \right)
- \left( 1 - \left| \lambda_f \right|^2 \right) \cos\left( \Delta mt \right)
- 2\ \operatorname{\mathcal I_m}\!\left\{\ \lambda_f\ \right\}\ \sin\left( \Delta mt \right)
\ \right] \\
\end{align}$$

where,
$$\begin{align}
\gamma &= \tfrac{1}{2} \left( \gamma_\mathsf H + \gamma_\mathsf L \right)\ \Delta\gamma = \gamma_\mathsf H - \gamma_\mathsf L \\
\Delta m &= m_\mathsf H - m_\mathsf L \\
\lambda_f &= \frac{ q }{ p } \frac{ \bar{A}_f }{ A_f } \\
A_f &= \left\langle f | P \right\rangle \\
\bar{A}_f &= \left\langle f | \bar{P} \right\rangle
\end{align}$$

From the above two quantities, it can be seen that even when there is no CP violation through mixing alone (i.e. $\ \left| \tfrac{q}{p} \right| = 1\$) and neither is there any CP violation through decay alone (i.e. $\ \left| \tfrac{\bar{A}_f}{A_f} \right| = 1\$) and thus $\ \left| \lambda_f \right| = 1\ ,$ the probabilities will still be unequal, provided that

$\operatorname{\mathcal I_m}\!\left\{\ \lambda_f\ \right\}\ =\ \operatorname{\mathcal I_m}\!\left\{\ \frac{q}{p}\frac{\bar{A}_f}{A_f}\ \right\} \ne 0$ (12)

The last terms in the above expressions for probability are thus associated with interference between mixing and decay.

=== An alternative classification ===
Usually, an alternative classification of CP violation is made:

Direct CP violation	Direct CP violation is defined as, $\left| \bar{A}_f / A_f \right| \ne 1$	In terms of the above categories, direct CP violation occurs in CP violation through decay only.
Indirect CP violation	Indirect CP violation is the type of CP violation that involves mixing.	In terms of the above classification, indirect CP violation occurs through mixing only, or through mixing-decay interference, or both.

== Specific cases ==
=== Neutrino oscillation ===
Considering a strong coupling between two pairs of flavor eigenstates of neutrinos (for example, ν_{e}–ν_{μ}, ν_{μ}–ν_{τ}, etc.) and a very weak coupling between either pair and the excluded third (that is, the third does not affect the interaction between the other two), equation (6) gives the probability of a neutrino of type $\alpha$ transmuting into type $\beta$ as

$$P_{\beta\alpha} \left( t \right) = \sin^2\theta \sin^2\left( \frac{E_+ - E_-}{2\hbar}t \right)$$

where, $E_+$ and $E_-$ are energy eigenstates.

The above can be written as

$P_{\beta\alpha} \left( x \right) = \sin^2\theta \sin^2\left( \frac{\Delta m^2 c^3}{4E\hbar}x \right) = \sin^2\theta \sin^2\left( \frac{2\pi}{\lambda_\text{osc}}x \right)$ (13)

where,
$\Delta m^2 = {m_+}^2 - {m_-}^2$, i.e. the difference between the squares of the masses of the energy eigenstates,

$c$ is the speed of light in vacuum,
$x$ is the distance traveled by the neutrino after creation,
$E$ is the energy with which the neutrino was created, and
$\lambda_\text{osc}$ is the oscillation wavelength.

Proof
$E_\pm = \sqrt{p^2 c^2 + {m_\pm}^2 c^4} \simeq pc\left( 1 + \frac{{m_\pm}^2 c^2}{2p^2} \right)\left[ \because \frac{m_\pm c}{p} \ll 1 \right]$

where $p$ is the momentum with which the neutrino was created.

Now, $E \simeq pc$ and $t \simeq x/c$.

Hence,

$$\frac{E_+ - E_-}{2\hbar}t \simeq
\frac{\left( {m_+}^2 - {m_-}^2 \right)c^3}{2p\hbar}t \simeq
\frac{\Delta m^2 c^3}{4E\hbar}x = \frac{2\pi}{\lambda_\text{osc}}x$$

where $\lambda_\text{osc} = \frac{8\pi E\hbar}{\Delta m^2 c^3}$

Thus, a coupling between the energy (mass) eigenstates produces the phenomenon of oscillation between the flavor eigenstates. One important inference is that neutrinos have a finite mass, although very small. Hence, their speed is not exactly the same as that of light but slightly lower.

==== Neutrino mass splitting ====
With three flavors of neutrinos, there are three mass splittings:

$$\begin{align}
\left( \Delta m^2 \right)_{12} &= {m_1}^2 - {m_2}^2 \\
\left( \Delta m^2 \right)_{23} &= {m_2}^2 - {m_3}^2 \\
\left( \Delta m^2 \right)_{31} &= {m_3}^2 - {m_1}^2
\end{align}$$

But only two of them are independent, because $\left( \Delta m^2 \right)_{12} + \left( \Delta m^2 \right)_{23} + \left( \Delta m^2 \right)_{31} = 0~$.

For solar neutrinos	$\left( \Delta m^2 \right)_\text{sol } \simeq 8 \times 10^{-5} \left( eV/c^2 \right)^2$
For atmospheric neutrinos	$\left( \Delta m^2 \right)_\text{atm} \simeq 3 \times 10^{-3} \left( eV/c^2 \right)^2$

This implies that two of the three neutrinos have very closely placed masses. Since only two of the three $\Delta m^2$ are independent, and the expression for probability in equation (13) is not sensitive to the sign of $\Delta m^2$ (as sine squared is independent of the sign of its argument), it is not possible to determine the neutrino mass spectrum uniquely from the phenomenon of flavor oscillation. That is, any two out of the three can have closely spaced masses.

Moreover, since the oscillation is sensitive only to the differences (of the squares) of the masses, direct determination of neutrino mass is not possible from oscillation experiments.

==== Length scale of the system ====
Equation (13) indicates that an appropriate length scale of the system is the oscillation wavelength $\lambda_\text{osc}$. We can draw the following inferences:

- If $x/\lambda_\text{osc} \ll 1$, then $P_{\beta\alpha} \simeq 0$ and oscillation will not be observed. For example, production (say, by radioactive decay) and detection of neutrinos in a laboratory.
- If $x/\lambda_\text{osc} \simeq n$, where $n$ is a whole number, then $P_{\beta\alpha} \simeq 0$ and oscillation will not be observed.
- In all other cases, oscillation will be observed. For example, $x/\lambda_\text{osc} \gg 1$ for solar neutrinos; $x \sim \lambda_\text{osc}$ for neutrinos from nuclear power plant detected in a laboratory few kilometers away.

=== Neutral kaon oscillation and decay ===
==== CP violation through mixing only ====
The 1964 paper by Christenson et al. provided experimental evidence of CP violation in the neutral Kaon system. The so-called long-lived Kaon (CP = −1) decayed into two pions (CP = (−1)(−1) = 1), thereby violating CP conservation.

$\left| K^0 \right\rangle$ and $\left| \bar{K}^0 \right\rangle$ being the strangeness eigenstates (with eigenvalues +1 and −1 respectively), the energy eigenstates are

$$\begin{align}
\left| K_{^1}^0 \right\rangle &= \frac{1}{\sqrt{2}} \left(\left| K^0 \right\rangle + \left| \bar{K}^0 \right\rangle\right) \\
\left| K_2^0 \right\rangle &= \frac{1}{\sqrt{2}}\left( \left| K^0 \right\rangle - \left| \bar{K}^0 \right\rangle \right)
\end{align}$$

These two are also CP eigenstates with eigenvalues +1 and −1 respectively. From the earlier notion of CP conservation (symmetry), the following were expected:

- Because $\left| K_{^1}^0 \right\rangle$ has a CP eigenvalue of +1, it can decay to two pions or with a proper choice of angular momentum, to three pions. However, the two pion decay is a lot more frequent.
- $\left| K_2^0 \right\rangle$ having a CP eigenvalue −1, can decay only to three pions and never to two.

Since the two pion decay is much faster than the three pion decay, $\left| K_{^1}^0 \right\rangle$ was referred to as the short-lived Kaon $\left| K_S^0 \right\rangle$, and $\left| K_2^0 \right\rangle$ as the long-lived Kaon $\left| K_L^0 \right\rangle$. The 1964 experiment showed that contrary to what was expected, $\left| K_L^0 \right\rangle$ could decay to two pions. This implied that the long lived Kaon cannot be purely the CP eigenstate $\left| K_2^0 \right\rangle$, but must contain a small admixture of $\left| K_{^1}^0 \right\rangle$, thereby no longer being a CP eigenstate. Similarly, the short-lived Kaon was predicted to have a small admixture of $\left| K_2^0 \right\rangle$. That is,

$$\begin{align}
\left| K_L^0 \right\rangle &= \frac{1}{\sqrt{1 + \left| \varepsilon \right|^2}}
\left( \left| K_2^0 \right\rangle + \varepsilon \left| K_1^0 \right\rangle \right) \\
\left| K_S^0 \right\rangle &= \frac{1}{\sqrt{1 + \left| \varepsilon \right|^2}}
\left( \left| K_1^0 \right\rangle + \varepsilon \left| K_2^0 \right\rangle \right)
\end{align}$$

where $\varepsilon$ is a complex quantity and is a measure of departure from CP invariance. Experimentally, $\left| \varepsilon \right| = \left( 2.228 \pm 0.011 \right)\times 10^{-3}$.

Writing $\left| K_{^1}^0 \right\rangle$ and $\left| K_2^0 \right\rangle$ in terms of $\left| K^0 \right\rangle$ and $\left| \bar{K}^0 \right\rangle$, we obtain (keeping in mind that $m_{K_L^0} > m_{K_S^0}$) the form of equation (9):

$$\begin{align}
\left| K_L^0 \right\rangle &= \left( p\left| K^0 \right\rangle - q\left| \bar{K}^0 \right\rangle \right) \\
\left| K_S^0 \right\rangle &= \left( p\left| K^0 \right\rangle + q\left| \bar{K}^0 \right\rangle \right)
\end{align}$$

where $\frac{q}{p} = \frac{1 - \varepsilon}{1 + \varepsilon}$.

Since $\left| \varepsilon \right|\ne 0$, condition (11) is satisfied and there is a mixing between the strangeness eigenstates $\left| K^0 \right\rangle$ and $\left| \bar{K}^0 \right\rangle$ giving rise to a long-lived and a short-lived state.

==== CP violation through decay only ====
The K^{0}_{L} and K^{0}_{S} have two modes of two pion decay: π^{0}π^{0} or π^{+}π^{−}. Both of these final states are CP eigenstates of themselves. We can define the branching ratios as,

$$\begin{align}
\eta_{+-} &=
\frac{\left\langle \pi^+\pi^- | K_L^0 \right\rangle}{\left\langle \pi^+\pi^- | K_S^0 \right\rangle} =
\frac{pA_{\pi^+\pi^-} - q\bar{A}_{\pi^+\pi^-}}{pA_{\pi^+\pi^-} + q\bar{A}_{\pi^+\pi^-}} =
\frac{1 - \lambda_{\pi^+\pi^-}}{1 + \lambda_{\pi^+\pi^-}} \\[3pt]
\eta_{00} &=
\frac{\left\langle \pi^0\pi^0 | K_L^0 \right\rangle}{\left\langle \pi^0\pi^0 | K_S^0 \right\rangle} =
\frac{pA_{\pi^0\pi^0} - q\bar{A}_{\pi^0\pi^0}}{pA_{\pi^0\pi^0} + q\bar{A}_{\pi^0\pi^0}} =
\frac{1 - \lambda_{\pi^0\pi^0}}{1 + \lambda_{\pi^0\pi^0}}
\end{align}$$.

Experimentally, $\eta_{+-} = \left( 2.232 \pm 0.011 \right) \times 10^{-3}$ and $\eta_{00} = \left( 2.220 \pm 0.011 \right) \times 10^{-3}$. That is $\eta_{+-} \ne \eta_{00}$, implying $\left| A_{\pi^+\pi^-}/\bar{A}_{\pi^+\pi^-} \right| \ne 1$ and $\left| A_{\pi^0\pi^0}/\bar{A}_{\pi^0\pi^0} \right| \ne 1$, and thereby satisfying condition (10).

In other words, direct CP violation is observed in the asymmetry between the two modes of decay.

==== CP violation through mixing-decay interference ====
If the final state (say $f_{CP}$) is a CP eigenstate (for example π^{+}π^{−}), then there are two different decay amplitudes corresponding to two different decay paths:

$$\begin{align}
K^0 &\to f_{CP} \\
K^0 &\to \bar{K}^0 \to f_{CP}
\end{align}$$.

CP violation can then result from the interference of these two contributions to the decay as one mode involves only decay and the other oscillation and decay.

== Which then is the "real" particle ==
The above description refers to flavor (or strangeness) eigenstates and energy (or CP) eigenstates. But which of them represents the "real" particle? What do we really detect in a laboratory? Quoting David J. Griffiths:

The neutral Kaon system adds a subtle twist to the old question, 'What is a particle?' Kaons are typically produced by the strong interactions, in eigenstates of strangeness (K^{0} and K̅^{0}), but they decay by the weak interactions, as eigenstates of CP (K_{1} and K_{2}). Which, then, is the 'real' particle? If we hold that a 'particle' must have a unique lifetime, then the 'true' particles are K_{1} and K_{2}. But we need not be so dogmatic. In practice, it is sometimes more convenient to use one set, and sometimes, the other. The situation is in many ways analogous to polarized light. Linear polarization can be regarded as a superposition of left-circular polarization and right-circular polarization. If you imagine a medium that preferentially absorbs right-circularly polarized light, and shine on it a linearly polarized beam, it will become progressively more left-circularly polarized as it passes through the material, just as a K^{0} beam turns into a K_{2} beam. But whether you choose to analyze the process in terms of states of linear or circular polarization is largely a matter of taste.

== Mixing matrix - a brief introduction ==
If the system is a three state system (for example, three species of neutrinos ν_{e} ⇄ ν_{μ} ⇄ ν_{τ}, three species of quarks d ⇄ s ⇄ b ), then, just like in the two state system, the flavor eigenstates (say $\left| {\varphi_\alpha} \right\rangle$, $\left| {\varphi_\beta} \right\rangle$, $\left| {\varphi_\gamma} \right\rangle$) are written as a linear combination of the energy (mass) eigenstates (say $\left| \psi_1 \right\rangle$, $\left| \psi_2 \right\rangle$, $\left| \psi_3 \right\rangle$). That is,

$$\begin{pmatrix}
\left| {\varphi_\alpha} \right\rangle \\
\left| {\varphi_\beta} \right\rangle  \\
\left| {\varphi_\gamma} \right\rangle \\
\end{pmatrix} = \begin{pmatrix}
\Omega_{\alpha 1} & \Omega_{\alpha 2} & \Omega_{\alpha 3} \\
\Omega_{\beta 1}  & \Omega_{\beta 2}  & \Omega_{\beta 3}  \\
\Omega_{\gamma 1} & \Omega_{\gamma 2} & \Omega_{\gamma 3} \\
\end{pmatrix}\begin{pmatrix}
\left| \psi_1 \right\rangle \\
\left| \psi_2 \right\rangle \\
\left| \psi_3 \right\rangle \\
\end{pmatrix}$$.

In case of leptons (neutrinos for example) the transformation matrix is the PMNS matrix, and for quarks it is the CKM matrix. (Note: N.B.: The three familiar neutrino species ν_{e}, ν_{μ}, and ν_{τ}, are flavor eigenstates, whereas the three familiar quarks species d, s, and b, are energy eigenstates.)

The off diagonal terms of the transformation matrix represent coupling, and unequal diagonal terms imply mixing between the three states.

The transformation matrix is unitary and appropriate parameterization (depending on whether it is the CKM or PMNS matrix) is done and the values of the parameters determined experimentally.

== See also ==
- CKM matrix
- CP violation
- CPT symmetry
- Kaon
- PMNS matrix
- Neutral current
- Flavor-changing neutral current
- Rabi cycle
