= Baryon asymmetry =

Imbalance of matter and antimatter in the observable universe

Unsolved problem in physics
What is the source of imbalance of matter and antimatter?
More unsolved problems in physics

In physical cosmology, the baryon asymmetry problem, also known as the matter asymmetry problem or the matter–antimatter asymmetry problem, is the observed imbalance in baryonic matter and antibaryonic matter in the observable universe. As the two form and behave in nearly identical ways, it is expected that they would have been created in near equal portions by the Big Bang, but, in reality, matter makes up the vast majority of the universe. Neither the Standard Model of particle physics nor the theory of general relativity provides an explanation for why this should be so. It is likely some physical laws must have acted differently in the very early universe and the minimum set of differences was proposed by Andrei Sakharov in 1967. Several competing hypotheses exist to explain the imbalance of matter and antimatter that resulted in baryogenesis. However, there is, so far, no consensus theory to explain the phenomenon, which has been described as "one of the great mysteries in physics".

== Sakharov conditions ==
In 1967, Andrei Sakharov proposed a set of three necessary conditions that a baryon-generating interaction must satisfy to produce matter and antimatter at different rates. These conditions were inspired by the recent discoveries of the cosmic microwave background and CP violation in the neutral kaon system. The three necessary "Sakharov conditions" are:

- Baryon number $B$ violation.
- C-symmetry violation and CP-symmetry violation.
- Interactions out of thermal equilibrium.

Baryon number violation is a necessary condition to produce an excess of baryons over anti-baryons. But C-symmetry violation is also needed so that the interactions which produce more baryons than anti-baryons will not be counterbalanced by interactions which produce more anti-baryons than baryons. CP-symmetry violation is similarly required because otherwise equal numbers of left-handed baryons and right-handed anti-baryons would be produced, as well as equal numbers of left-handed anti-baryons and right-handed baryons. Finally, the interactions must be out of thermal equilibrium, since otherwise CPT symmetry would assure compensation between processes increasing and decreasing the baryon number.

=== Baryon number violation ===
Currently, there is no experimental evidence of particle interactions where the conservation of baryon number is broken perturbatively: this would appear to suggest that all observed particle reactions have an equal baryon number before and after. Mathematically, the commutator of the baryon number quantum operator with the (perturbative) Standard Model hamiltonian is zero: $[B,H] = BH - HB = 0$. However, the Standard Model is known to violate the conservation of baryon number: a $U(1)_B$ Adler–Bell–Jackiw anomaly captured by a triangle Feynman diagram $U(1)_B$-$SU(2)_w$-$SU(2)_w$ with $SU(2)_w$ weak interaction gauge group. To account for baryon violation in baryogenesis, such events (including proton decay) can occur in Grand Unification Theories (GUTs) and supersymmetric (SUSY) models via hypothetical massive bosons such as the X boson.

=== CP-symmetry violation ===
The second condition for generating baryon asymmetry—violation of charge-parity symmetry—is that a process is able to happen at a different rate to its antimatter counterpart. In the Standard Model, CP violation appears as a complex phase in the quark mixing matrix of the weak interaction. There may also be a non-zero CP-violating phase in the neutrino mixing matrix, but this is currently unmeasured. The first in a series of basic physics principles to be violated was parity through Chien-Shiung Wu's experiment. This led to CP violation being verified in the 1964 Fitch–Cronin experiment with neutral kaons, which resulted in the 1980 Nobel Prize in Physics (direct CP violation, that is violation of CP symmetry in a decay process, was discovered later, in 1999). Due to CPT symmetry, violation of CP symmetry demands violation of time inversion symmetry, or T-symmetry. Despite the allowance for CP violation in the Standard Model, it is insufficient to account for the observed baryon asymmetry of the universe (BAU) given the limits on baryon number violation, meaning that beyond-Standard Model sources are needed.

A possible new source of CP violation was found at the Large Hadron Collider (LHC) by the LHCb collaboration during the first three years of LHC operations (beginning March 2010). The experiment analyzed the decays of two particles, the bottom Lambda (Λ_{b}^{0}) and its antiparticle, and compared the distributions of decay products. The data showed an asymmetry of up to 20% of CP-violation sensitive quantities, implying a breaking of CP-symmetry. This analysis will need to be confirmed by more data from subsequent runs of the LHC.

One method to search for additional CP-violation is the search for electric dipole moments of fundamental or composed particles. The existence of electric dipole moments in equilibrium states requires violation of T-symmetry. That way finding a non zero electric dipole moment would imply the existence of T-violating interactions in the vacuum corrections to the measured particle. So far all measurements are consistent with zero putting strong bounds on the properties of the yet unknown new CP-violating interactions.

=== Interactions out of thermal equilibrium ===
In the out-of-equilibrium decay scenario, the last condition states that the rate of a reaction which generates baryon-asymmetry must be less than the rate of expansion of the universe. In this situation the particles and their corresponding antiparticles do not achieve thermal equilibrium due to rapid expansion decreasing the occurrence of pair-annihilation.

== Other explanations ==
=== Regions of the universe where antimatter dominates ===
Another possible explanation of the apparent baryon asymmetry is that matter and antimatter are essentially separated into different, widely distant regions of the universe. The formation of antimatter galaxies was originally thought to explain the baryon asymmetry, as from a distance, antimatter atoms are indistinguishable from matter atoms; both produce light (photons) in the same way. Along the boundary between matter and antimatter regions, however, annihilation (and the subsequent production of gamma radiation) would be detectable, depending on its distance and the density of matter and antimatter. Such boundaries, if they exist, would likely lie in deep intergalactic space. The density of matter in intergalactic space is reasonably well established at about one atom per cubic meter. Assuming this is a typical density near a boundary, the gamma ray luminosity of the boundary interaction zone can be calculated. No such zones have been detected, but 30 years of research have placed bounds on how far they might be. On the basis of such analyses, it is now deemed unlikely that any region within the observable universe is dominated by antimatter.

=== Mirror universe ===
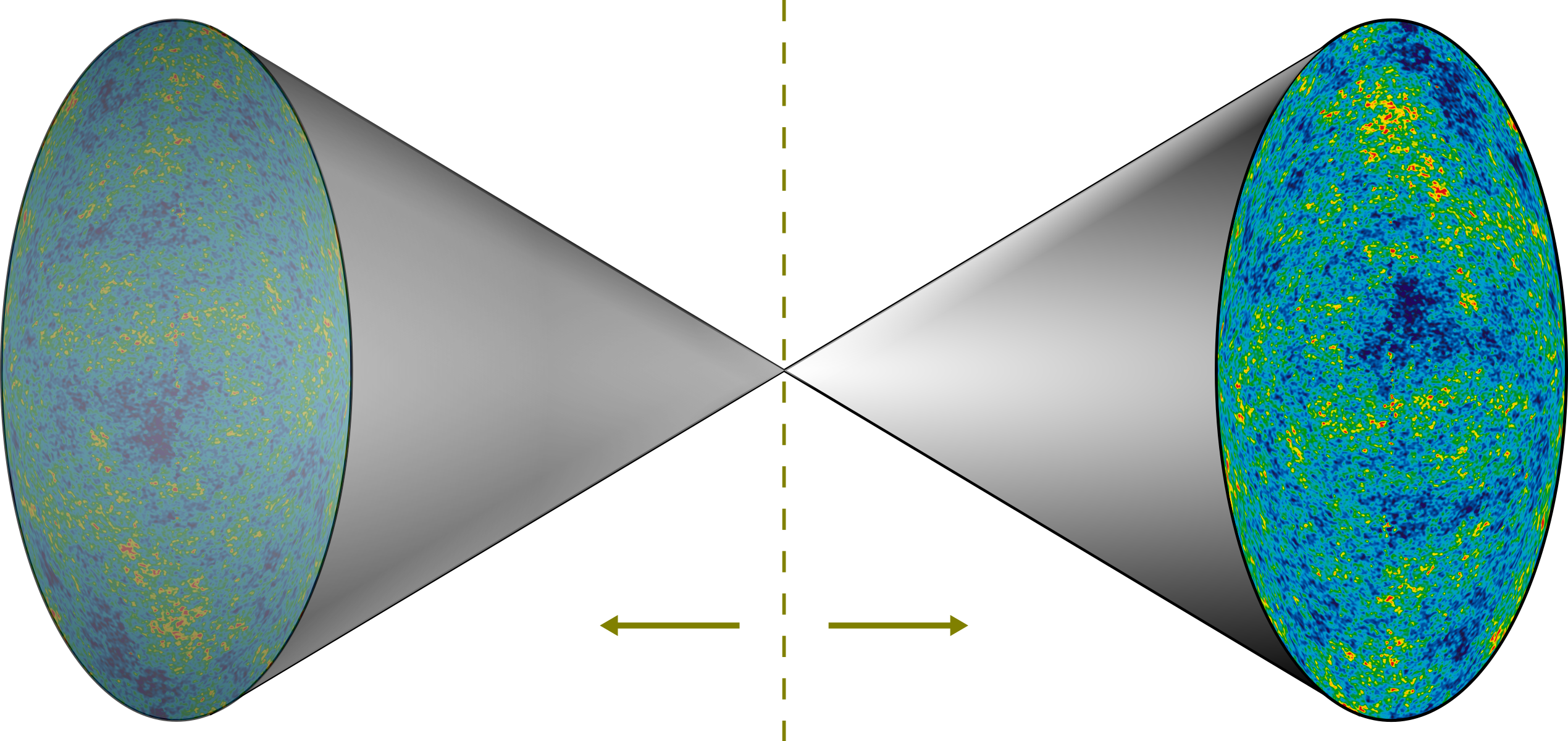
In the mirror anti-universe theory, the Big Bang generated a universe–antiuniverse pair. This universe flows forward in time, while the mirror counterpart flows backward.

In the CPT symmetric universe theory (also called the mirror universe theory) the universe does not violate the CPT symmetry, because the Big Bang would be a double sided event, both classically and quantum mechanically, consisting of a universe-antiuniverse pair. This means that the universe is the charge (C), parity (P) and time (T) image of an anti-universe. This pair emerged from the Big Bang epochs not directly into a hot, radiation-dominated era. The antiuniverse would flow back in time from the Big Bang, becoming bigger as it does so, and would be also dominated by antimatter. Its spatial properties are inverted if compared to those in our universe, a situation analogous to creating electron–positron pairs in a vacuum. This model, developed by physicists Latham Boyle and Neil Turok, proposes that temperature fluctuations in the cosmic microwave background (CMB) are due to the quantum-mechanical nature of space-time near the Big Bang singularity.

This model provides a natural explanation for the observed baryon asymmetry: the mirror universe is dominated by antimatter in the same way that the observed universe is dominated by matter.

=== Cyclic cosmology ===
In cyclic cosmology (for example the Big Bounce) the initial baryon asymmetry is order of magnitudes smaller, because it (cyclic cosmology) is entropic and not a perfect spatiotemporal defaulting, thus previous conditions generate a boost bias increasing the rate of matter over antimatter.

== Baryon asymmetry parameter ==
The challenges to the physics theories are then to explain how to produce the predominance of matter over antimatter, and also the magnitude of this asymmetry. An important quantifier is the asymmetry parameter,

$$\eta = \frac{n_B - n_{\bar B}}{n_\gamma}.$$

This quantity relates the overall number density difference between baryons and antibaryons (n_{B} and n_{B̅}, respectively) and the number density of cosmic background radiation photons n_{γ}.

According to the Big Bang model, matter decoupled from the cosmic background radiation (CBR) at a temperature of roughly 3000 kelvin, corresponding to an average kinetic energy of 3000 K / (10.08×10^{3} K/eV) = 0.3 eV. After the decoupling, the total number of CBR photons remains constant. Therefore, due to space-time expansion, the photon density decreases. The photon density at equilibrium temperature T per cubic centimeter, is given by

$$n_\gamma = \frac{1}{\pi^2} \left(\frac{k_B T}{\hbar c}\right)^3 \times\int_0^\infty \frac{x^2}{e^x - 1} \, dx =
\frac{1}{\pi^2}\left(\frac{k_B T}{\hbar c}\right)^3 \times 2\,\zeta(3)\approx
20.3 \left(\frac{T}{1\text{K}}\right)^3 \text{cm}^{-3},$$

with k_{B} as the Boltzmann constant, ħ as the Planck constant divided by 2π and c as the speed of light in vacuum, and ζ(3) as Apéry's constant. At the current CBR photon temperature of 2.725 K, this corresponds to a photon density n_{γ} of around 411 CBR photons per cubic centimeter.

Therefore, the asymmetry parameter η, as defined above, is not the "good" parameter. Instead, the preferred asymmetry parameter uses the entropy density s,

$$\eta_s = \frac{n_B - n_{\bar B}}{s}$$

because the entropy density of the universe remained reasonably constant throughout most of its evolution. The entropy density is

$$s \ \stackrel{\mathrm{def}}{=}\  \frac{\mathrm{entropy}}{\mathrm{volume}} = \frac{p + \rho}{T} = \frac{2\pi^2}{45}g_{*}(T) T^3$$

with p and ρ as the pressure and density from the energy density tensor T_{μν}, and g_{*} as the effective number of degrees of freedom for "massless" particles (inasmuch as mc^{2} ≪ k_{B}T holds) at temperature T,

$$g_*(T) = \sum_{i=\mathrm{bosons}} g_i \left(\frac{T_i}{T}\right)^3 + \frac{7}{8}\sum_{j=\mathrm{fermions}} g_j{\left(\frac{T_j}{T}\right)}^3,$$

for bosons and fermions with g_{i} and g_{j} degrees of freedom at temperatures T_{i} and T_{j} respectively. Presently, s = 7.04n_{γ}.

== See also ==
- Baryogenesis
- CP violation
- List of unsolved problems in physics
