= CP violation =

Violation of charge-parity symmetry in particle physics and cosmology

In particle physics, CP violation is a violation of CP-symmetry (or charge conjugation parity symmetry): the combination of C-symmetry (charge conjugation symmetry) and P-symmetry (parity symmetry). CP-symmetry states that the laws of physics should be the same if a particle is interchanged with its antiparticle (C-symmetry) while its spatial coordinates are inverted ("mirror" or P-symmetry).

CP violation is only observed in the weak interaction. The discovery of CP violation in 1964 in the decays of neutral kaons resulted in the Nobel Prize in Physics in 1980 for its discoverers James Cronin and Val Fitch. CP violation was subsequently discovered in many other meson decays. In 2025, the LHCb experiment discovered CP violation in baryons. There is some evidence CP violation may occur in neutrino interactions.

It is important to the matter-antimatter asymmetry problem and the strong CP problem, and in the study of weak interactions in particle physics. Under the CPT theorem, every CP violation is also a time-symmetry violation.

== Overview ==
Until the 1950s, parity conservation was believed to be one of the fundamental geometric conservation laws (along with conservation of energy and conservation of momentum). After the discovery of parity violation in 1956, CP-symmetry was proposed to restore order. However, while the strong interaction and electromagnetic interaction are experimentally found to be invariant under the combined CP transformation operation, further experiments showed that this symmetry is slightly violated during certain types of weak decay.

Only a weaker version of the symmetry could be preserved by physical phenomena, which was CPT symmetry. Besides C and P, there is a third operation, time reversal T, which corresponds to reversal of motion. Invariance under time reversal implies that whenever a motion is allowed by the laws of physics, the reversed motion is also an allowed one and occurs at the same rate forwards and backwards.

The combination of CPT is thought to constitute an exact symmetry of all types of fundamental interactions. Because of the long-held CPT symmetry theorem, provided that it is valid, a violation of the CP-symmetry is equivalent to a violation of the T-symmetry. In this theorem, regarded as one of the basic principles of quantum field theory, charge conjugation, parity, and time reversal are applied together. Direct observation of the time reversal symmetry violation without any assumption of CPT theorem was done in 1998 by two groups, CPLEAR and KTeV collaborations, at CERN and Fermilab, respectively. As early as 1970, Klaus Schubert observed T violation independent of assuming CPT symmetry by using the Bell–Steinberger unitarity relation.

== History ==
=== P-symmetry ===
The idea behind parity symmetry was that the equations of particle physics are invariant under mirror inversion. This led to the prediction that the mirror image of a reaction (such as a chemical reaction or radioactive decay) occurs at the same rate as the original reaction. However, in 1956 a careful critical review of the existing experimental data by theoretical physicists Tsung-Dao Lee and Chen-Ning Yang revealed that while parity conservation had been verified in decays by the strong or electromagnetic interactions, it was untested in the weak interaction. They proposed several possible direct experimental tests.

The first test based on beta decay of cobalt-60 nuclei was carried out in 1956 by a group led by Chien-Shiung Wu, and demonstrated conclusively that weak interactions violate the P-symmetry or, as the analogy goes, some reactions did not occur as often as their mirror image. However, parity symmetry still appears to be valid for all reactions involving electromagnetism and strong interactions.

=== CP-symmetry ===
Overall, the symmetry of a quantum mechanical system can be restored if another approximate symmetry S can be found such that the combined symmetry PS remains unbroken. This rather subtle point about the structure of Hilbert space was realized shortly after the discovery of P violation, and it was proposed that charge conjugation, C, which transforms a particle into its antiparticle, was the suitable symmetry to restore order.

In 1956 Reinhard Oehme in a letter to Chen-Ning Yang and shortly after, Boris L. Ioffe, Lev Okun and A. P. Rudik showed that the parity violation meant that charge conjugation invariance must also be violated in weak decays. Charge violation was confirmed in the Wu experiment and in experiments performed by Valentine Telegdi and Jerome Friedman and Richard Garwin and Leon Lederman, who observed parity non-conservation in pion and muon decay and found that C is also violated. Charge violation was more explicitly shown in experiments done by John Riley Holt at the University of Liverpool.

Oehme then wrote a paper with Lee and Yang in which they discussed the interplay of non-invariance under P, C and T. The same result was also independently obtained by Ioffe, Okun and Rudik. Both groups also discussed possible CP violations in neutral kaon decays.

Lev Landau proposed in 1957 CP-symmetry, often called just CP, as the true symmetry between matter and antimatter. CP-symmetry is the product of two transformations: C for charge conjugation and P for parity. In other words, a process in which all particles are exchanged with their antiparticles was assumed to be equivalent to the mirror image of the original process and so the combined CP-symmetry would be conserved in the weak interaction.

In 1962, a group of experimentalists at Dubna, on Okun's insistence, unsuccessfully searched for CP-violating kaon decay.

== Experimental status ==
=== Indirect CP violation ===
In 1964, James Cronin, Val Fitch and coworkers provided clear evidence from kaon decay that CP-symmetry could be broken. (cf. also Ref.). This work won them the 1980 Nobel Prize. This discovery showed that weak interactions violate not only the charge-conjugation symmetry C between particles and antiparticles and the P or parity symmetry, but also their combination. The discovery shocked particle physics and opened the door to questions still at the core of particle physics and of cosmology today. The lack of an exact CP-symmetry, but also the fact that it is so close to a symmetry, introduced a great puzzle.

The kind of CP violation (CPV) discovered in 1964 was linked to the fact that neutral kaons can transform into their antiparticles (in which each quark is replaced with the other's antiquark) and vice versa, but such transformation does not occur with exactly the same probability in both directions; this is called indirect CP violation.

=== Direct CP violation ===
Kaon oscillation box diagram

The two box diagrams above are the Feynman diagrams providing the leading contributions to the amplitude of K^{0}-K̅^{0} oscillation

Despite many searches, no other manifestation of CP violation was discovered until the 1990s, when the NA31 experiment at CERN suggested evidence for CP violation in the decay process of the very same neutral kaons (direct CP violation). The observation was somewhat controversial, and final proof for it came in 1999 from the KTeV experiment at Fermilab and the NA48 experiment at CERN.

Starting in 2001, a new generation of experiments, including the BaBar experiment at the Stanford Linear Accelerator Center (SLAC) and the Belle Experiment at the High Energy Accelerator Research Organisation (KEK) in Japan, observed direct CP violation in a different system, namely in decays of the B mesons. A large number of CP violation processes in B meson decays have now been discovered. Before these "B-factory" experiments, there was a logical possibility that all CP violation was confined to kaon physics. However, this raised the question of why CP violation did not extend to the strong force, and furthermore, why this was not predicted by the unextended Standard Model, despite the model's accuracy for "normal" phenomena.

In 2011, a hint of CP violation in decays of neutral D meson decays was reported by the LHCb experiment at CERN using 0.6 fb^{−1} of run 1 data. However, the same measurement using the full 3.0 fb^{−1} run 1 sample was consistent with CP-symmetry.

In 2013 LHCb announced discovery of CP violation in strange B meson decays.

In March 2019, LHCb announced discovery of CP violation in charmed D^{0}_{c} decays with a deviation from zero of 5.3 standard deviations.

In 2020, the T2K Collaboration reported some indications of CP violation in leptons for the first time. In this experiment, beams of muon neutrinos (ν_{μ}) and muon antineutrinos (ν̅_{μ} ) were alternately produced by an accelerator. By the time they got to the detector, a significantly higher proportion of electron neutrinos (ν_{e} ) was observed from the ν_{μ} beams, than electron antineutrinos (ν̅_{e} ) were from the ν̅_{μ} beams. Analysis of these observations was not yet precise enough to determine the size of the CP violation, relative to that seen in quarks. In addition, another similar experiment, NOνA sees no evidence of CP violation in neutrino oscillations and is in slight tension with T2K.

In May 2024, a team of theoretical physicists at Brown University determined the third half-life asymmetry of hydrogen-based quark valve amplifiers indicated potential CP violation.

In March 2025, LHCb announced discovery of CP violation in baryon decays with a deviation from zero of 5.2 standard deviations, specifically the bottom lambda baryon ( Λ_{b} ).

== CP violation in the Standard Model ==
"Direct" CP violation is allowed in the Standard Model if a complex phase appears in the Cabibbo–Kobayashi–Maskawa matrix (CKM matrix) describing quark mixing, or the Pontecorvo–Maki–Nakagawa–Sakata matrix (PMNS matrix) describing neutrino mixing. A necessary condition for the appearance of the complex phase is the presence of at least three generations of fermions. If fewer generations are present, the complex phase parameter can be absorbed into redefinitions of the fermion fields.

A popular rephasing invariant whose vanishing signals absence of CP violation and occurs in most CP violating amplitudes is the Jarlskog invariant:

$$\ J = c_{12}\ c_{13}^2\ c_{23}\ s_{12}\ s_{13}\ s_{23}\ \sin \delta\ \approx\ 0.00003 \ ,$$

for quarks, which is $\ 0.0003\$ times the maximum value of $\ J_{\max} = \tfrac{1}{6 \sqrt{3}}\ \approx\ 0.1\ .$ For leptons, only an upper limit exists: $\ |J| < 0.03\ .$

The reason why such a complex phase causes CP violation (CPV) is not immediately obvious, but can be seen as follows. Consider any given particles (or sets of particles) $\ a\$ and $\ b\ ,$ and their antiparticles $\ \bar{a}\$ and $\ \bar{b}\ .$ Now consider the processes $\ a \rightarrow b\$ and the corresponding antiparticle process $\ \bar{a} \rightarrow \bar{b}\ ,$ and denote their amplitudes ${\cal M}$ and $\bar{\cal M}$ respectively. Before CP violation, these terms must be the same complex number. We can separate the magnitude and phase by writing ${\cal M} = |{\cal M}|\ e^{i\theta}$. If a phase term is introduced from (e.g.) the CKM matrix, denote it $e^{i\phi}$. Note that $\bar{\cal M}$ contains the conjugate matrix to ${\cal M}$, so it picks up a phase term $e^{-i\phi}$.

Now the formula becomes:

$$\begin{align}
{\cal M} &= |{\cal M}|\ e^{i\theta}\ e^{+i\phi} \\
\bar{\cal M} &= |{\cal M}|\ e^{i\theta}\ e^{-i\phi}
\end{align}$$

Physically measurable reaction rates are proportional to $\ |{\cal M}|^{2}$, thus so far nothing is different. However, consider that there are two different routes: $a \overset{1}{\longrightarrow} b$ and $a \overset{2}{\longrightarrow} b$ or equivalently, two unrelated intermediate states: $a \rightarrow 1\rightarrow b$ and $a \rightarrow 2\rightarrow b$. This is exactly the case for the kaon where the decay is performed via different quark channels (see the Figure above). In this case we have:

$$\begin{alignat}{3}
{\cal M} &= |{\cal M}_1|\ e^{i\theta_1}\ e^{i\phi_1} && + |{\cal M}_2|\ e^{i\theta_2}\ e^{i\phi_2} \\
\bar{\cal M} &= |{\cal M}_1|\ e^{i\theta_1}\ e^{-i\phi_1} && + |{\cal M}_2|\ e^{i\theta_2}\ e^{-i\phi_2}\ .
\end{alignat}$$

Some further calculation gives:

$$|{\cal M}|^{2} - |\bar{\cal M}|^{2} = -4\ |{\cal M}_1|\ |{\cal M}_2|\ \sin(\theta_1 - \theta_2)\ \sin(\phi_1 - \phi_2).$$

Thus, we see that a complex phase gives rise to processes that proceed at different rates for particles and antiparticles, and CP is violated.

From the theoretical end, the CKM matrix is defined as $\ V_\mathrm{CKM} = U_u^\dagger U_d$, where $U_u$ and $U_d$ are unitary transformation matrices which diagonalize the fermion mass matrices $M_u$ and $M_d$, respectively.

Thus, there are two necessary conditions for getting a complex CKM matrix:

1. At least one of $U_u$ and $U_d$ is complex, or the CKM matrix will be purely real.
2. If both of them are complex, $U_u$ and $U_d$ must be different, i.e., $U_u \neq U_d$, or the CKM matrix will be an identity matrix, which is also purely real.

For a standard model with three fermion generations, the most general non-Hermitian pattern of its mass matrices can be given by

$$M= \begin{bmatrix} A_1 +i D_1 & B_1 +i C_1 & B_2+i C_2 \\ B_4+i C_4 & A_2+i D_2 & B_3+i C_3 \\ B_5+i C_5 & B_6+i C_6 & A_3+i D_3 \end{bmatrix}.$$

This M matrix contains 9 elements and 18 parameters, 9 from the real coefficients and 9 from the imaginary coefficients. Obviously, a 3x3 matrix with 18 parameters is too difficult to diagonalize analytically. However, a naturally Hermitian $\mathbf{M^2} = M \cdot M^\dagger$ can be given by

$$\mathbf{M^2}=
\begin{bmatrix}
\mathbf{A_1} & \mathbf{B_1}+ i \mathbf{C_1} & \mathbf{B_2} + i \mathbf{C_2} \\ \mathbf{B_1}- i \mathbf{C_1} & \mathbf{A_2} & \mathbf{B_3}+ i \mathbf{C_3} \\ \mathbf{B_2}- i \mathbf{C_2}& \mathbf{B_3}- i \mathbf{C_3}& \mathbf{A_3}
\end{bmatrix},$$

and it has the same unitary transformation matrix U with M. Besides, parameters in $\mathbf{M^2}$ are correlated to those in M directly in the ways shown below

$$\begin{align}
\mathbf{A_1} &= A_1^2 + D_1^2 + B_1^2 + C_1^2 + B_2^2 + C_2^2, \\
\mathbf{A_2} &= A_2^2 + D_2^2 + B_3^2 + C_3^2 + B_4^2 + C_4^2, \\
\mathbf{A_3} &= A_3^2 + D_3^2 + B_5^2 + C_5^2 + B_6^2 + C_6^2, \\
\mathbf{B_1} &= A_1 B_4 + D_1 C_4 + B_1 A_2 + C_1 D_2 + B_2 B_3 +C_2 C_3, \\
\mathbf{B_2} &= A_1 B_5 + D_1 C_5 + B_1 B_6 + C_1 C_6 + B_2 A_3 +C_2 D_3, \\
\mathbf{B_3} &= B_4 B_5 + C_4 C_5 + B_6 A_2 + C_6 D_2 + A_3 B_3 +D_3 C_3, \\
\mathbf{C_1} &= D_1 B_4 -A_1 C_4 +A_2 C_1 -B_1 D_2 +B_3 C_2 -B_2 C_3, \\
\mathbf{C_2} &= D_1 B_5 -A_1 C_5 +B_6 C_1 -B_1 C_6 +A_3 C_2 -B_2 D_3, \\
\mathbf{C_3} &= C_4 B_5 -B_4 C_5 +D_2 B_6 -A_2 C_6 +A_3 C_3 -B_3 D_3.
\end{align}$$

That means if we diagonalize an $\mathbf{M^2}$ matrix with 9 parameters, it has the same effect as diagonalizing an $M$ matrix with 18 parameters. Therefore, diagonalizing the $\mathbf{M^2}$ matrix is certainly the most reasonable choice.

The $M$ and $\mathbf{M^2}$ matrix patterns given above are the most general ones. The perfect way to solve the CPV problem in the standard model is to diagonalize such matrices analytically and to achieve a U matrix which applies to both. Unfortunately, even though the $\mathbf{M^2}$ matrix has only 9 parameters, it is still too complicated to be diagonalized directly. Thus, an assumption

$\mathbf{M^2}_R \cdot \mathbf{M^{2\dagger}}_I + \mathbf{M^2}_I \cdot \mathbf{M^{2\dagger}}_R =0$

was employed to simplify the pattern, where $\mathbf{ M^2}_R$ is the real part of $\mathbf{M^2}$ and $\mathbf{M^2}_I$ is the imaginary part.

Such an assumption could further reduce the parameter number from 9 to 5 and the reduced $\mathbf{M^2}$ matrix can be given by

$$\mathbf {M^2} = \begin{bmatrix} \mathbf{A} + \mathbf{B} (x y- {x \over y}) & y \mathbf{B} & x \mathbf{B} \\ y \mathbf{B} & \mathbf{A} +\mathbf{B} ({y \over x}-{x \over y}) & \mathbf{B} \\ x \mathbf{B} & \mathbf{B} & \mathbf{A} \end{bmatrix}
+ i \begin{bmatrix} 0 & {\mathbf{C} \over y} & - {\mathbf{C} \over x} \\ - {\mathbf{C} \over y} & 0 & \mathbf{C} \\ {\mathbf{C} \over x} & - \mathbf{C} & 0 \end{bmatrix}
\equiv \mathbf{ M^2}_R + i \mathbf{M^2}_I,$$

where $\mathbf{A} \equiv \mathbf{A_3}, \mathbf{B} \equiv \mathbf{B_3}, \mathbf{C} \equiv \mathbf{C_3}, x \equiv \mathbf{B_2 / B_3},$ and $y \equiv \mathbf{B_1 / B_3}$.

Diagonalizing $\mathbf{M^2}$ analytically, the eigenvalues are given by

$\mathbf{m_1}^2 = \mathbf{A}-\mathbf{B}{x \over y} - \mathbf{C}{\sqrt{x^2 +y^2 +x^2 y^2} \over x y},$

$\mathbf{m_2}^2 = \mathbf{A}-\mathbf{B}{x \over y} + \mathbf{C}{\sqrt{x^2 +y^2 +x^2 y^2} \over x y},$

$\mathbf{m_3}^2 = \mathbf{A}+\mathbf{B}{(x^2+1)y \over x},$

and the $U$ matrix for up-type quarks can then be given by

$$U_u =
\begin{bmatrix}
{-\sqrt{x^2+y^2} \over \sqrt{2(x^2+y^2+x^2y^2)}}
& {-\sqrt{x^2+y^2} \over \sqrt{2(x^2+y^2+x^2y^2)}}
& {x y \over \sqrt{x^2+y^2+x^2y^2}} \\
{x(y^2-i\sqrt{x^2+y^2+x^2y^2}) \over
\sqrt{x^2+y^2}\sqrt{2(x^2+y^2+x^2y^2)}}
& {x(y^2+i\sqrt{x^2+y^2+x^2y^2}) \over
\sqrt{x^2+y^2}\sqrt{2(x^2+y^2+x^2 y^2)}}
& {y \over \sqrt{x^2+y^2+x^2y^2}} \\
{y(x^2+i\sqrt{x^2+y^2+x^2y^2}) \over
\sqrt{x^2+y^2}\sqrt{2(x^2+y^2+x^2y^2)}}
& {y(x^2-i\sqrt{x^2+y^2+x^2y^2}) \over
\sqrt{x^2+y^2}\sqrt{2(x^2+y^2+x^2y^2)}}
& {x \over \sqrt{x^2+y^2+x^2 y^2}}
\end{bmatrix}.$$

However, the order of the eigenvalues and correspondingly the order of the columns of $U_u$ does not necessarily have to be $(\mathbf{m_1}^2, \mathbf{m_2}^2, \mathbf{m_3}^2)$ but can be any permutation of those.

After obtaining a general $U$ matrix pattern, the same procedure can be applied to down-type quarks by introducing primed parameters. To construct the CKM matrix, the conjugate transpose of the $U$ matrix for up-type quarks, denoted as $U_u^\dagger$, has to be multiplied with the $U$ matrix for down-type quarks, denoted as $U_d$. As mentioned earlier, there are no inherent constraints that dictate the assignment of eigenvalues to specific quark flavors. All $3!\times 3!=36$ potential permutations of eigenvalues are listed elsewhere.

Among these 36 potential CKM matrices, 4 of them

$$V[52] = V \begin{bmatrix} 1 \\ 3 \\ 2 \end{bmatrix}  \begin{bmatrix} 2 & 3 & 1 \end{bmatrix} = V[25]^*=V^* \begin{bmatrix} 2 \\ 3 \\ 1 \end{bmatrix} \begin{bmatrix} 1 & 3 & 2 \end{bmatrix} = \begin{bmatrix} s & p & r \\ p^{\prime} & q & p^{\prime *} \\ r^* & p^* & s^*  \end{bmatrix}$$
and

$$V[22] = V \begin{bmatrix} 2 \\ 3 \\ 1 \end{bmatrix}  \begin{bmatrix} 2 & 3 & 1 \end{bmatrix} = V[55]^*=V^*\begin{bmatrix} 1 \\ 3 \\ 2 \end{bmatrix} \begin{bmatrix} 1 & 3 & 2 \end{bmatrix}
= \begin{bmatrix} r^* & p^* & s^* \\ p^{\prime *} & q & p^{\prime} \\ s & p & r \end{bmatrix},$$

fit experimental data to the order of $\lambda^{1/2}$ or better, at tree level, where $\lambda$ is one of the Wolfenstein parameters.

The full expressions of parameters $p, q, r, s,$ and $p^{\prime}$ are given by

$$\begin{aligned}
r &=& {{(x^2+y^2)(x'^2+y'^2)+(x x' +y y')(x y x' y' +\sqrt{x^2+y^2+x^2 y^2} \sqrt{x'^2+ y'^2 +x'^2 y'^2})}
\over {2 \sqrt{ x^2+y^2} \sqrt{ x'^2+y'^2}\sqrt{x^2+y^2+x^2 y^2} \sqrt{x'^2+y'^2+x'^2 y'^2} }} \\
&+& i {{ (x y' -x' y)(x' y' \sqrt{x^2+y^2+x^2 y^2} +x y \sqrt{x'^2 +y'^2 +x'^2 y'^2})}
\over {2 \sqrt{ x^2+y^2} \sqrt{ x'^2+y'^2}\sqrt{x^2+y^2+x^2 y^2}\sqrt{x'^2+y'^2+x'^2 y'^2}}}, \\
s &=& {{(x^2+y^2)(x'^2+y'^2)+(x x' +y y')(x y x' y' -\sqrt{x^2+y^2+x^2 y^2} \sqrt{x'^2+ y'^2 +x'^2 y'^2})}
\over {2 \sqrt{ x^2+y^2} \sqrt{ x'^2+y'^2}\sqrt{x^2+y^2+x^2 y^2} \sqrt{x'^2+y'^2+x'^2 y'^2} }}  \\
&+& i {{ (x y' -x' y)(x' y' \sqrt{x^2+y^2+x^2 y^2} -x y \sqrt{x'^2 +y'^2 +x'^2 y'^2})}
\over {2 \sqrt{ x^2+y^2} \sqrt{ x'^2+y'^2}\sqrt{x^2+y^2+x^2 y^2}\sqrt{x'^2+y'^2+x'^2 y'^2}}}, \\
p &=& {{[y' y^2(x-x')+ x' x^2 (y-y')]+ i (x y' -x' y) \sqrt{x^2+y^2+x^2 y^2}}
\over {\sqrt{2} \sqrt{ x^2+y^2}  \sqrt{x^2+y^2+x^2 y^2}\sqrt{x'^2+y'^2+x'^2 y'^2}}}, \\
p^{\prime} &=& {{[y y'^2 (x'-x)+ x x'^2 (y'-y)]+  i (x y' -x' y) \sqrt{x'^2+y'^2+x'^2 y'^2}}
\over {\sqrt{2} \sqrt{ x^2+y^2+x^2 y^2}    \sqrt{ x'^2+y'^2}\sqrt{x'^2+y'^2+x'^2 y'^2}} }, \\
q &=& {{x x'+y y' +x y x' y'}\over {\sqrt{ x^2+y^2+x^2 y^2} \sqrt{x'^2+y'^2+x'^2 y'^2}}}.
\end{aligned}$$

Since the discovery of CP violation in 1964, physicists have believed that in theory, within the framework of the Standard Model, it is sufficient to search for appropriate Yukawa couplings (equivalent to a mass matrix) in order to generate a complex phase in the CKM matrix, thus automatically breaking CP symmetry. However, the specific matrix pattern has remained elusive. The above derivation provides the first evidence for this idea and offers some explicit examples to support it.

== Strong CP problem ==
Unsolved problem in physics
Why is the strong nuclear interaction force CP-invariant?
More unsolved problems in physics

There is no experimentally known violation of the CP-symmetry in quantum chromodynamics. As there is no known reason for it to be conserved in QCD specifically, this is a "fine tuning" problem known as the strong CP problem.

QCD does not violate the CP-symmetry as easily as the electroweak theory; unlike the electroweak theory in which the gauge fields couple to chiral currents constructed from the fermionic fields, the gluons couple to vector currents. Experiments do not indicate any CP violation in the QCD sector. For example, a generic CP violation in the strongly interacting sector would create the electric dipole moment of the neutron which would be comparable to 10^{−18} e·m while the experimental upper bound is roughly one trillionth that size.

This is a problem because at the end, there are natural terms in the QCD Lagrangian that are able to break the CP-symmetry.

$${\mathcal L} = -\frac{1}{4} F_{\mu\nu} F^{\mu\nu} - \frac{n_f g^2\theta}{32\pi^2}
F_{\mu\nu} \tilde F^{\mu\nu} + \bar \psi\left(i\gamma^\mu D_\mu - m
e^{i\theta'\gamma_5}\right) \psi$$

For a nonzero choice of the θ angle and the chiral phase of the quark mass θ′ one expects the CP-symmetry to be violated. One usually assumes that the chiral quark mass phase can be converted to a contribution to the total effective $\scriptstyle{\tilde\theta}$ angle, but it remains to be explained why this angle is extremely small instead of being of order one; the particular value of the θ angle that must be very close to zero (in this case) is an example of a fine-tuning problem in physics, and is typically solved by physics beyond the Standard Model.

There are several proposed solutions to solve the strong CP problem. The most well-known is Peccei–Quinn theory, involving new scalar particles called axions. A newer, more radical approach not requiring the axion is a theory involving two time dimensions first proposed in 1998 by Bars, Deliduman, and Andreev.

== Matter–antimatter imbalance ==
Unsolved problem in physics
Why does the universe have so much more matter than antimatter?
More unsolved problems in physics

The observable universe is made mainly of matter, rather than consisting of equal parts of matter and antimatter as might be expected. It can be demonstrated that, to create an imbalance in matter and antimatter from an initial condition of balance, the Sakharov conditions must be satisfied, one of which is the existence of CP violation during the extreme conditions of the first seconds after the Big Bang. Explanations which do not involve CP violation are less plausible, since they rely on the assumption that the matter–antimatter imbalance was present at the beginning, or on other admittedly exotic assumptions.

The Big Bang should have produced equal amounts of matter and antimatter if CP symmetry was preserved; as such, there should have been total cancellation of both—protons should have cancelled with antiprotons, electrons with positrons, neutrons with antineutrons, and so on. This should have resulted in a sea of radiation in the universe with no real matter, only virtual matter that fluctuates and propagates the radiation. Since this is not the case, after the Big Bang, physical laws must have acted differently for matter and antimatter; i.e. violating CP symmetry.

The Standard Model contains at least three sources of CP violation. The first of these, involving the Cabibbo–Kobayashi–Maskawa matrix in the quark sector, has been observed experimentally and can only account for a small portion of the CP violation required to explain the matter-antimatter asymmetry. The strong interaction should also violate CP, in principle, but the failure to observe the electric dipole moment of the neutron in experiments suggests that any CP violation in the strong sector is also too small to account for the necessary CP violation in the early universe. The third source of CP violation is the Pontecorvo–Maki–Nakagawa–Sakata matrix in the lepton sector. The current long-baseline neutrino oscillation experiments, T2K and NOνA, may be able to find evidence of CP violation over a small fraction of possible values of the CP violating Dirac phase while the proposed next-generation experiments, Hyper-Kamiokande and DUNE, shall be sensitive enough to definitively observe CP violation over a relatively large fraction of possible values of the Dirac phase. Further into the future, a neutrino factory could be sensitive to nearly all possible values of the CP-violating Dirac phase. If neutrinos are Majorana fermions, the PMNS matrix could have two additional CP-violating Majorana phases, leading to a fourth source of CP violation within the Standard Model. The experimental evidence for Majorana neutrinos should be the observation of neutrinoless double-beta decay. The best limits come from the GERDA experiment. CP violation in the lepton sector generates a matter-antimatter asymmetry through a process called leptogenesis. This could become the preferred explanation in the Standard Model for the matter-antimatter asymmetry of the universe if CP violation is experimentally confirmed in the lepton sector.

If CP violation in the lepton sector is experimentally determined to be too small to account for matter-antimatter asymmetry, some new physics beyond the Standard Model may be required to explain additional sources of CP violation. Adding new particles and/or interactions to the Standard Model generally introduces new sources of CP violation since CP is not a symmetry of nature.

Sakharov proposed a way to restore CP-symmetry using T-symmetry, extending spacetime before the Big Bang. He described complete CPT reflections of events on each side of what he called the "initial singularity". Because of this, phenomena with an opposite arrow of time at t < 0 undergo an opposite CP violation, so the CP-symmetry is preserved as a whole. The anomalous excess of matter over antimatter after the Big Bang in the orthochronous (or positive) sector becomes an excess of antimatter before the Big Bang (antichronous or negative sector) as charge conjugation, parity, and arrow of time are reversed due to CPT reflections of all phenomena occurring over the initial singularity:

We can visualize that neutral spinless maximons (or photons) are produced at t < 0 from contracting matter having an excess of antiquarks, that they pass "one through the other" at the instant t = 0 when the density is infinite, and decay with an excess of quarks when t > 0, realizing total CPT symmetry of the universe. All the phenomena at t < 0 are assumed in this hypothesis to be CPT reflections of the phenomena at t > 0.

— Andrei Sakharov, in Collected Scientific Works (1982).

== See also ==
- B-factory
- BTeV experiment
- C-symmetry
- Cabibbo–Kobayashi–Maskawa matrix
- CP violating moments
- CPT symmetry
- LHCb experiment
- Neutral particle oscillation
- Parity (physics) § Parity violation
- Penguin diagram
- T-symmetry
