= Two-photon physics =

Branch of particle physics concerning interactions between two photons

A Feynman diagram (box diagram) for photon–photon scattering: one photon scatters from the transient vacuum charge fluctuations of the other

Two-photon physics, also called gamma–gamma physics, is a branch of particle physics that describes the interactions between two photons. Normally, beams of light pass through each other unperturbed. Inside an optical material, and if the intensity of the beams is high enough, the beams may affect each other through a variety of non-linear optical effects. In pure vacuum, some weak scattering of light by light exists as well. Also, above some threshold of this center-of-mass energy of the system of the two photons, matter can be created.

== Astronomy ==
=== Cosmological/intergalactic gamma rays ===
Photon–photon interactions limit the spectrum of observed gamma-ray photons at moderate cosmological distances to a photon energy below around 20 GeV, that is, to a wavelength of greater than approximately 6.2×10^{−11} m. This limit reaches up to around 20 TeV at merely intergalactic distances. An analogy would be light traveling through a fog: at near distances a light source is more clearly visible than at long distances due to the scattering of light by fog particles. Similarly, the further a gamma-ray travels through the universe, the more likely it is to be scattered by an interaction with a low energy photon from the extragalactic background light.

At those energies and distances, very high energy gamma-ray photons have a significant probability of a photon-photon interaction with a low energy background photon from the extragalactic background light resulting in either the creation of particle-antiparticle pairs via direct pair production or (less often) by photon-photon scattering events that lower the incident photon energies. This renders the universe effectively opaque to very high energy photons at intergalactic to cosmological distances.

== Experiments ==
Two-photon physics can be studied with high-energy particle accelerators, where the accelerated particles are not the photons themselves but charged particles that will radiate photons. The most significant studies so far were performed at the Large Electron–Positron Collider (LEP) at CERN. If the transverse momentum transfer and thus the deflection is large, one or both electrons can be detected; this is called tagging. The other particles that are created in the interaction are tracked by large detectors to reconstruct the physics of the interaction.

Frequently, photon-photon interactions will be studied via ultraperipheral collisions (UPCs) of heavy ions, such as gold or lead. These are collisions in which the colliding nuclei do not touch each other; i.e., the impact parameter $b$ is larger than the sum of the radii of the nuclei. The strong interaction between the quarks composing the nuclei is thus greatly suppressed, making the weaker electromagnetic $\gamma\gamma$ interaction much more visible. In UPCs, because the ions are heavily charged, it is possible to have two independent interactions between a single ion pair, such as production of two electron-positron pairs. UPCs are studied with the STARlight simulation code.

Light-by-light scattering, as predicted in, can be studied using the strong electromagnetic fields of the hadrons collided at the LHC, it has first been seen in 2016 by the ATLAS collaboration and was then confirmed by the CMS collaboration., including at high two-photon energies. The best previous constraint on the elastic photon–photon scattering cross section was set by PVLAS, which reported an upper limit far above the level predicted by the Standard Model. Observation of a cross section larger than that predicted by the Standard Model could signify new physics such as axions, the search of which is the primary goal of PVLAS and several similar experiments.

== Processes ==
From quantum electrodynamics it can be found that photons cannot couple directly to each other and a fermionic field according to the Landau-Yang theorem since they carry no charge and no 2 fermion + 2 boson vertex exists due to requirements of renormalizability, but they can interact through higher-order processes or couple directly to each other in a vertex with an additional two W bosons: a photon can, within the bounds of the uncertainty principle, fluctuate into a virtual charged fermion–antifermion pair, to either of which the other photon can couple. This fermion pair can be leptons or quarks. Thus, two-photon physics experiments can be used as ways to study the photon structure, or, somewhat metaphorically, what is "inside" the photon.

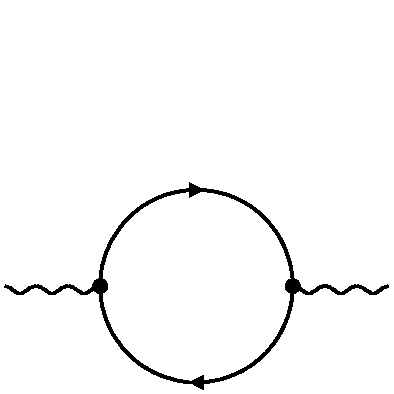
The photon fluctuates into a fermion–antifermion pair.

Creation of a fermion–antifermion pair through the direct two-photon interaction. These drawings are Feynman diagrams.

There are three interaction processes:

- Direct or pointlike: The photon couples directly to a quark inside the target photon. If a lepton–antilepton pair is created, this process involves only quantum electrodynamics (QED), but if a quark–antiquark pair is created, it involves both QED and perturbative quantum chromodynamics (QCD).

The intrinsic quark content of the photon is described by the photon structure function, experimentally analyzed in deep-inelastic electron–photon scattering.

- Single resolved: The quark pair of the target photon form a vector meson. The probing photon couples to a constituent of this meson.
- Double resolved: Both target and probe photon have formed a vector meson. This results in an interaction between two hadrons.

For the latter two cases, the scale of the interaction is such as the strong coupling constant is large. This is called vector meson dominance (VMD) and has to be modelled in non-perturbative QCD.

== See also ==
- Channelling radiation has been considered as a method to generate polarized high energy photon beams for gamma–gamma colliders.
- Matter creation
- Pair production
- Delbrück scattering
- Breit–Wheeler process
