= F meson =

== F meson ==
- Outdated name for the strange D meson.

== f and f' mesons ==
- Term for scalar mesons with J^{PC} 0^{++} consisting of light quarks.
