= VMD =

VMD may refer to:

- Vector meson dominance, in physics a model describing the hadron photoproduction process
- Versatile Multilayer Disc, a discontinued high-capacity optical disc technology
- The academic degree bestowed upon a Veterinary Medical Doctor or (colloquially) a veterinarian by a university—e.g. 'Jane Smith, VMD.'
  - The VMD degree (Veterinariae Medicinae Doctoris) is the equivalent of the DVM degree conferred by The University of Pennsylvania
- Veterinary Medicines Directorate, a UK government agency regulating veterinary medicines
- Victoria Machinery Depot, a western Canadian shipyard and heavy equipment manufacturer
- Video Marc Dorcel, a French production company of pornographic film|pornographic films
- Visual Molecular Dynamics, a molecular modelling and visualization computer program
- Vocaloid Motion Data, a kinematics export format of MikuMikuDance
