= Pseudoscalar meson =

Meson with total spin 0 and odd parity

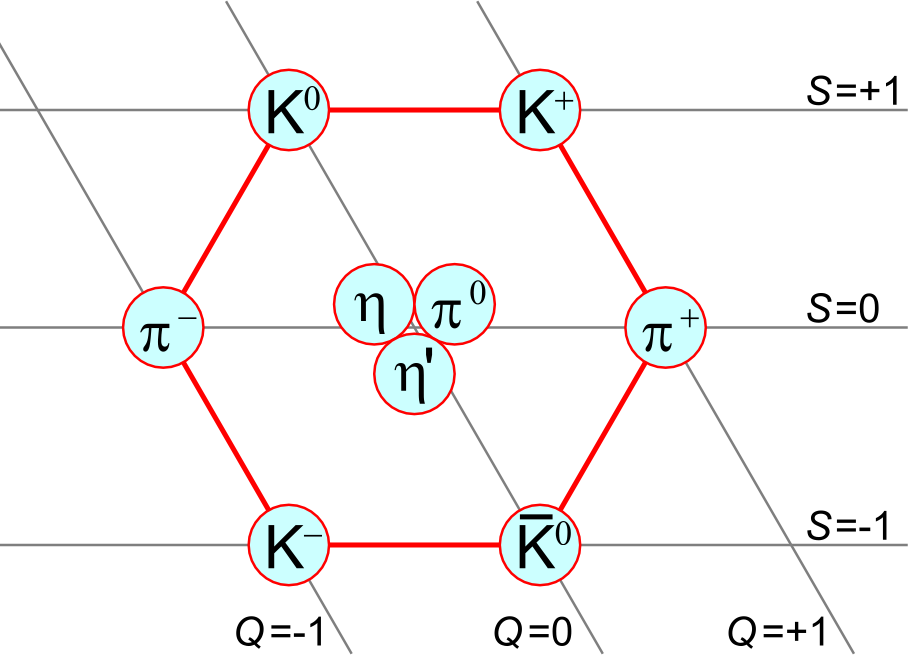
The pseudoscalar mesons consisting of up, down, and strange quarks only form a nonet.

In high-energy physics, a pseudoscalar meson is a meson with total spin 0 and odd parity (usually notated as J^{P} = 0^{−} ). (Note: Compare the definition of the pseudoscalar meson to the scalar meson.) Pseudoscalar mesons are commonly seen in proton–proton scattering and proton–antiproton annihilation, and include the pion (π), kaon (K), eta (η), and eta prime (η′) particles, whose masses are known with great precision.

Among all of the mesons known to exist, in some sense, the pseudoscalars are the most well studied and understood.

== History ==
The pion (π) was first proposed to exist by Yukawa in the 1930s as the primary force carrying boson of the Yukawa potential in nuclear interactions, and was later observed at nearly the same mass that he originally predicted for it. In the 1950s and 1960s, the pseudoscalar mesons began to proliferate, and were eventually organized into a multiplet according to Murray Gell-Mann's so-called "Eightfold Way".

Gell-Mann further predicted the existence of a ninth resonance in the pseudoscalar multiplet, which he originally called X. Indeed, this particle was later found and is now known as the eta prime meson (η′). The structure of the pseudoscalar meson multiplet, and also the ground state baryon multiplets, led Gell-Mann (and Zweig, independently) to create the well known quark model.

== η–η′ puzzle ==
Despite the pseudoscalar mesons' masses being known to high precision, and being the most well studied and understood mesons, the decay properties of the pseudoscalar mesons, particularly of eta (η) and eta-prime (η′), are somewhat contradictory to their mass hierarchy: While the η′ meson is much more massive than the η meson, the η meson is thought to contain a larger component of the relatively heavy strange and anti-strange quarks, than the η′ meson does, which appears contradictory. This failure of the quark model to explain this mass difference is called the "η–η′ puzzle".

The presence of an η(1405) state also brings glueball mixing into the discussion. It is possible that the η and η′ mesons mix with the pseudoscalar glueball which should occur somewhere above the scalar glueball in mass, as an unmixed state. This is one of a few ways in which the unexpectedly large η′ mass of 957.78 MeV/c^{2} can be explained, relative to its model-predicted mass around 250–300 MeV/c^{2}.

== List of pseudoscalar mesons ==
Meson nonet	Mesons with heavy quarks	Hypothetical mesons
pion (×3) η meson (×1) η′ meson (×1); Kaon (×4)	D meson B meson η_{c} meson η_{b} meson	η_{t} meson (Note: Because the top quark decays into a bottom quark much faster than the cloud of gluons that bind it to other quarks can assemble (a unique instance of the weak force acting more quickly than the strong force), it is currently [2021] believed that composite particles containing the top quark do not form, with the possible exception of collisions with such high energy that they have only ever occurred in the first milliseconds of the Big Bang.)

== See also ==
- List of mesons
- Vector meson
- Pseudovector meson
- Pseudoscalar boson
