= Omega meson =

Subatomic particle

- Composition: ω: $\approx \frac{u\bar{u}+d\bar{d}}{\sqrt{2}}$
- Statistics: Bosonic
- Family: Mesons
- Interactions: Strong, weak, electromagnetic, gravity
- Symbol: ω
- Antiparticle: Self
- Theorized: Yoichiro Nambu (1957)
- Discovered: Lawrence Berkeley National Laboratory (1961)
- Types: 1
- Mass: 782.66±0.13 MeV/c^{2}
- Mean lifetime: (7.58±0.11)×10^{−23} s
- Decays into: π^{+}+π^{0}+π^{−} or π^{0}+γ
- Electric charge: 0 e
- Spin: 1
- Isospin: 0
- Hypercharge: 0
- Parity: −1
- C parity: −1

The omega meson (ω) is a flavourless meson formed from a superposition of an up quark–antiquark and a down quark–antiquark pair. It is part of the vector meson nonet and mediates the nuclear force along with pions and rho mesons.

== Properties ==
The most common decay mode for the ω meson is π^{+}π^{0}π^{−} at 89.2%±0.7%, followed by π^{0}γ at 8.34%±0.26%.

Particle name	Particle symbol	Antiparticle symbol	Quark content	Rest mass (MeV/c^{2})	I^{G}	J^{PC}	S	C	B'	Mean lifetime (s)	Commonly decays to (>5% of decays)
Omega meson	ω(782)	Self	$\frac{u\bar{u}+d\bar{d}}{\sqrt{2}}$	782.66 ± 0.13	0^{−}	1^{−−}	0	0	0	(7.58±0.11)×10^{−23} s	π^{+}+π^{0}+π^{−} or π^{0}+γ

The quark composition of the ω meson can be thought of as a mix between uu̅, dd̅ and ss̅ states, but it is very nearly a pure symmetric uu̅–dd̅ state. This can be shown by deconstructing the wave function of the ω into its component parts. We see that the ω and ϕ mesons are mixtures of the SU(3) wave functions as follows.

$$\omega = \psi_8 \sin\theta + \psi_1 \cos\theta$$,
$$\phi = \psi_8 \cos\theta - \psi_1 \sin\theta$$,

where

$\theta$ is the nonet mixing angle,
$\psi_1 = \frac{u\overline{u} + d\overline{d} + s\overline{s}}{\sqrt{3}}$ and
$$\psi_8 = \frac{u\overline{u} + d\overline{d} - 2s\overline{s}}{\sqrt{6}}$$.

The mixing angle at which the components decouple completely can be calculated to be $\arctan\frac{1}{\sqrt{2}}\approx35.3^\circ$, which almost corresponds to the actual value calculated from the masses of 35°. Therefore, the ω meson is nearly a pure symmetric uu̅–dd̅ state.

== See also ==
- List of mesons
- Quark model
- Vector meson
