= Scalar boson =

Boson with spin equal to zero

A scalar boson is a boson whose spin equals zero. A boson is a particle whose wave function is symmetric under particle exchange and therefore follows Bose–Einstein statistics. The spin–statistics theorem implies that all bosons have an integer-valued spin. Scalar bosons are the subset of bosons with zero-valued spin.

The name scalar boson arises from quantum field theory, which demands that fields of spin-zero particles transform like a scalar under Lorentz transformation (i.e. are Lorentz invariant).

A pseudoscalar boson is a scalar boson that has odd parity, whereas "regular" scalar bosons have even parity.

== Examples ==
=== Scalar ===
- The only fundamental scalar boson in the Standard Model of particle physics is the Higgs boson, the existence of which was confirmed on 14 March 2013 at the Large Hadron Collider by CMS and ATLAS. As a result of this confirmation, the 2013 Nobel Prize in Physics was awarded to Peter Higgs and François Englert.
- Various known composite particles are scalar bosons, e.g. the alpha particle and scalar mesons.
- The φ^{4}-theory or quartic interaction is a popular "toy model" quantum field theory that uses scalar bosonic fields, used in many introductory quantum textbooks to introduce basic concepts in field theory.

=== Pseudoscalar ===
- There are no fundamental pseudoscalars in the Standard Model, but there are several pseudoscalar mesons, like the pion.

== See also ==
- Scalar field theory
- Klein–Gordon equation
- Vector boson
- Higgs boson
