= Scalar meson =

Meson with total spin 0 and even parity

In high energy physics, a scalar meson is a meson with total spin 0 and even parity (usually noted as J^{P}=0^{+}). In contrast, pseudoscalar mesons have odd parity. The first known scalar mesons have been observed since the late 1950s, with observations of numerous light states and heavier states proliferating since the 1980s. Scalar mesons are most often observed in proton-antiproton annihilation, radiative decays of vector mesons, and meson-meson scattering.

== Groups ==
The light (unflavored) scalar mesons may be divided into three groups:

- mesons having a mass below 1 GeV/c^{2}
- mesons having a mass between 1 GeV/c^{2} and 2 GeV/c^{2}
- other radially-excited unflavored scalar mesons above 2 GeV/c^{2}

=== Lower mass range ===
Since the late 1950s, the lightest scalar mesons were often interpreted within the framework of the linear sigma model, and many theorists still choose this interpretation of the scalar mesons as the chiral partners of the pseudoscalar meson multiplet.

With the re-introduction of the σ meson as an acceptable candidate for a light scalar meson in 1996 by Tornqvist and Roos, in-depth studies into the lightest scalar mesons were conducted with renewed interest.

Ever since Jaffe first suggested the existence of tetraquark multiplets in 1977, the lightest scalar mesons have been interpreted by some theorists to be possible tetraquark or meson-meson "molecule" states. The tetraquark interpretation works well with the MIT Bag Model of QCD, where the scalar tetraquarks are actually predicted to have lower mass than the conventional scalar mesons. This picture of the scalar mesons seems to fit experimental results well in certain ways, but often receives harsh criticism for ignoring unsolved problems with chiral symmetry breaking and the possibility of a non-trivial vacuum state as suggested by Gribov.

Many attempts have been made to determine the quark content of the lighter scalar mesons; however, no consensus has yet been reached.

=== Intermediate range ===
In-depth studies of the unflavored scalar mesons began with the Crystal Ball and Crystal Barrel experiments of the mid-1990s, focusing on the mass range between 1 GeV/c^{2} and 2 GeV/c^{2}.

The scalar mesons in the mass range of 1 GeV/c^{2} to 2 GeV/c^{2} are generally believed to be conventional quark-antiquark states with orbital excitation L = 1 and spin excitation S = 1, although they occur at a higher mass than one would expect in the framework of mass-splittings from spin–orbit coupling. The scalar glueball is also expected to fall in this mass region, appearing in similar fashion to the conventional mesons but having very distinctive decay characteristics. The scalar mesons in the mass range below 1 GeV/c^{2} are much more controversial, and may be interpreted in a number of different ways.

=== Upper mass range ===
The heavier scalar mesons contain charm and/or bottom quarks. All occur well over 2 GeV/c^{2} and have well-separated masses which make them distinct and simplifies their analyses.

== List ==
=== Confirmed ===
- K_{0}^{*}(1430)

=== Candidates ===
- K_{0}^{*}(800) or κ
- f_{0}(500) or σ
- f_{0}(980)
- a_{0}(980)
- f_{0}(1370)
- f_{0}(1500)
- f_{0}(1710)
- a_{0}(1450)

=== Unconfirmed resonances ===
- X(1110)
- f_{0}(1200-1600)
- f_{0}1790
- X(1810)

== See also ==
- List of mesons
- Pseudovector meson
- Scalar boson
