= Pseudovector meson =

In high energy physics, a pseudovector meson or axial vector meson is a meson with total spin 1 and even parity (+) (usually denoted J^{P} = 1^{+}).

Compare to a vector meson, which has a total spin 1 and odd parity (that is, J^{P} = 1^{−}).

== Charge parity (C) in addition to spatial parity (P) ==
The known pseudovector mesons fall into two different classes, all have even spatial parity (P = +), but they differ in another kind of parity called charge parity (C) which can be either even (+) or odd (−). The two types of pseudovector meson are:

- those with odd charge parity J^{PC} = 1^{+−}
- those with even charge parity J^{PC} = 1^{++}

The 1^{+−} group has no intrinsic spin excitation (S = 0), but do gain spin from angular momentum (L = 1) of the orbits of the two constituent quarks around their mutual center. The second group (1^{++}) have both intrinsic spin S = 1, and L = 1, with L and S coupling to J = 1.

Pseudovector, or axial vector, mesons in the 1^{+−} category are most readily seen in proton‑antiproton annihilation and pion‑nucleon scattering. The mesons in the 1^{++} category are normally seen in proton-proton and pion-nucleon scattering.

== Discrepant mass estimates ==
The difference between the two groups gives them slightly different masses, from the spin‑orbit coupling rule. Theoretically, the h and b mesons are in the 1^{+−} group, and should have heavier masses, according to the spin-orbit mass splitting. However, the measured masses of the mesons do not appear to follow the rule, as evidenced by the f and a mesons being heavier. There are considerable uncertainties in experimental measurement of pseudovector mesons; more experimental data will be needed to confirm and accurately determine the discrepancy between theory and measurement.

The 1^{++} multiplet of light mesons may show similar behavior to that of other vector mesons, in that the mixing of light quarks with strange quarks appears to be small for this quantum number. The 1^{+−} multiplet, on the other hand, may be affected by other factors that generally reduce meson masses. Again, further experimentation is required in order to solidify the observations.

== Examples ==
- 1^{+−} candidates: h_{1}(1170), b_{1}(1235), h_{1}(1380)
- 1^{++} candidates: f_{1}(1285), a_{1}(1260), f_{1}(1420)
- strange candidates: K_{1}(1270), K_{1}(1400)
- heavy candidates: h_{c}, χ_{c1}

== See also ==
- List of mesons
- Pseudoscalar meson
- Scalar meson
- Pseudovector boson
