= Vector meson dominance =

In physics, vector meson dominance (VMD) was a model developed by J. J. Sakurai in the 1960s before the introduction of quantum chromodynamics to describe interactions between energetic photons and hadronic matter.

In particular, the hadronic components of the physical photon consist of the lightest vector mesons, $\rho$, $\omega$ and $\phi$. Therefore, interactions between photons and hadronic matter occur by the exchange of a hadron between the dressed photon and the hadronic target.

== Background ==
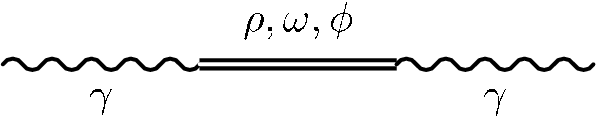
Hadronic contribution to the photon propagator in the VMD model

Measurements of the interaction between energetic photons and hadrons show that the interaction is much more intense than expected by the interaction of merely photons with the hadron's electric charge. Furthermore, the interaction of energetic photons with protons is similar to the interaction of photons with neutrons in spite of the fact that the electric charge structures of protons and neutrons are substantially different.

According to VMD, the photon is a superposition of the pure electromagnetic photon (which interacts only with electric charges) and vector meson.

Just after 1970, when more accurate data on the above processes became available, some discrepancies with the VMD predictions appeared and new extensions of the model were published. These theories are known as Generalized Vector Meson Dominance theories (GVMD).

== VMD and Hidden Local Symmetry ==
Whilst the ultraviolet description of the standard model is based on QCD, work over many decades has involved writing a low energy effective description of QCD, and further, positing a possible "dual" description. One such popular description is that of the hidden local symmetry. The dual description is based on the idea of emergence of gauge symmetries in the infrared of strongly coupled theories. Gauge symmetries are not really physical symmetries (only the global elements of the local gauge group are physical). This emergent property of gauge symmetries was demonstrated in Seiberg duality and later in the development of the AdS/CFT correspondence. In its generalised form, Vector Meson Dominance appears in AdS/CFT, AdS/QCD, AdS/condensed matter and some Seiberg dual constructions. It is therefore a commonplace idea within the theoretical physics community.

== Criticism ==
Measurements of the photon-hadron interactions in higher energy levels show that VMD cannot predict the interaction in such levels. In his Nobel lecture J.I. Friedman summarizes the situation of VMD as follows: "...this eliminated the model [VMD] as a possible description of deep inelastic scattering... calculations of the generalized vector-dominance failed in general to describe the data over the full kinematic range..."

The Vector Meson Dominance model still sometimes makes significantly more accurate predictions of hadronic decays of excited light mesons involving photons than subsequent models such as the relativistic quark model for the meson wave function and the covariant oscillator quark model. Similarly, the Vector Meson Dominance model has outperformed perturbative QCD in making predictions of transitional form factors of the neutral pion meson, the eta meson, and the eta prime meson, that are "hard to explain within QCD." And, the model accurately reproduces recent experimental data for rho meson decays. Generalizations of the Vector Meson Dominance model to higher energies, or to consider additional factors present in cases where VMD fails, have been proposed to address the shortcomings identified by Friedman and others.

== See also ==
- Matter creation
- Photon structure function
