= Photon structure function =

Function characterizing the interactions between photons and quarks

The photon structure function, in quantum field theory, describes the quark content of the photon. While the photon is a massless boson, through certain processes its energy can be converted into the mass of massive fermions. The function is defined by the process e + γ → e + hadrons. It is uniquely characterized by the linear increase in the logarithm of the electronic momentum transfer log Q^{2} and by the approximately linear rise in x , the fraction of the quark momenta within the photon. These characteristics are borne out by the experimental analyses of the photon structure function.

== Theoretical basis ==
Photons with high photon energy can transform in quantum mechanics to lepton and quark pairs, the latter fragmented subsequently to jets of hadrons, i.e. protons, pions, etc. At high energies E the lifetime t of such quantum fluctuations of mass M becomes nearly macroscopic: t ≈ E/M^{2}; this amounts to flight lengths as large as one micrometer for electron pairs in a 100 GeV photon beam, while even for light hadrons the length is on the order of 10 fermi, i.e. 10x the radius of a proton. High energy photon beams have been generated by photon radiation off electron beams in e^{−}e^{+} circular beam facilities such as PETRA at DESY in Hamburg and LEP at CERN in Geneva. Exceedingly high photon energies may be generated in the future by shining laser light on teraelectronvolt electron beams in a linear collider facility.

The classical technique for analyzing the virtual particle content of photons is provided by scattering electrons off the photons. In high-energy, large-angle scattering the experimental facility can be viewed as an electron microscope of very high resolution Q, corresponding to the momentum transfer in the scattering process according to Heisenberg's uncertainty principle. The intrinsic quark structure of the target photon beam is revealed by observing characteristic patterns of the scattered electrons in the final state.

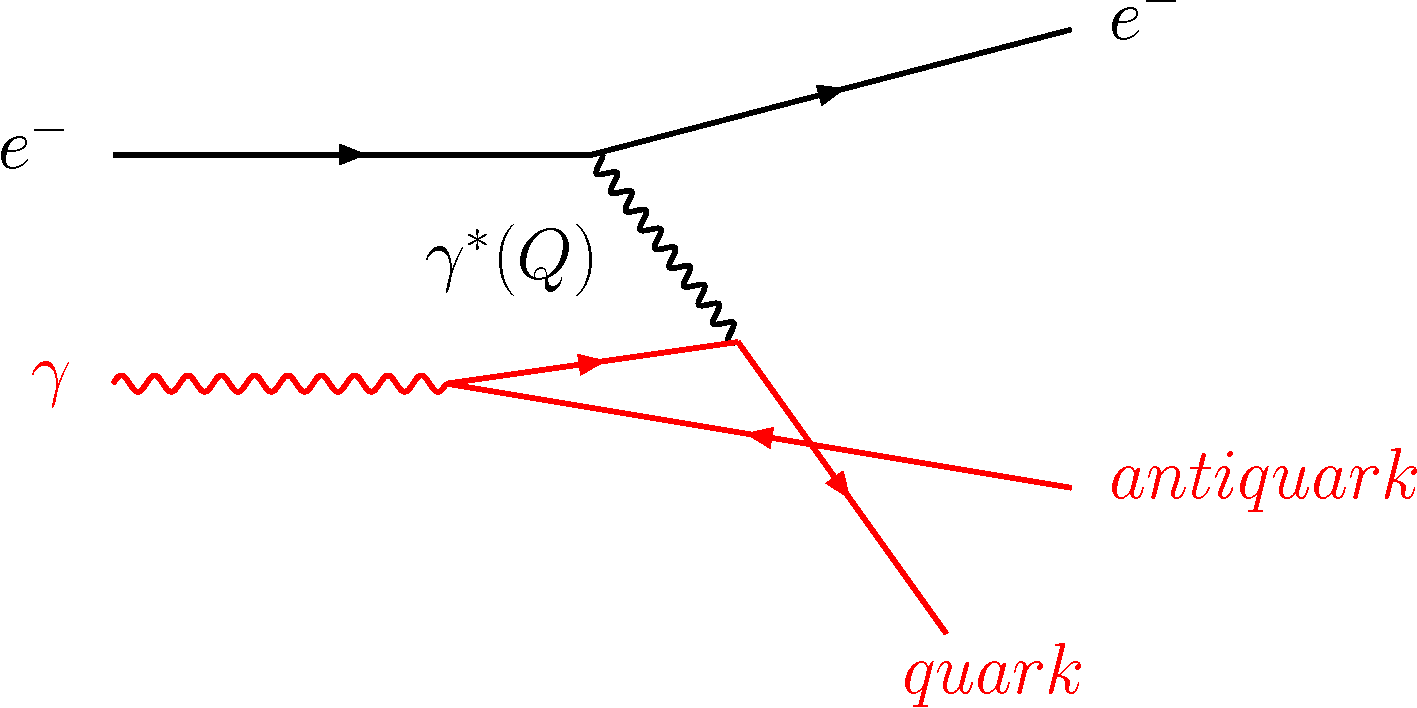
Figure 1. Electron–photon scattering generic Feynman diagram.

The incoming target photon splits into a nearly collinear quark–antiquark pair. The impinging electron is scattered off the quark to large angles, the scatter pattern revealing the internal quark structure of the photon. Quark and antiquark finally transform to hadrons. Photon structure function can be described quantitatively in quantum chromodynamics (QCD), the theory of quarks as constituents of the strongly interacting elementary particles, which are bound together by gluonic forces. The primary splitting of photons to quark pairs, cf. Fig. 1, regulates the essential characteristics of the photon structure function, the number and the energy spectrum of the quark constituents within the photon. QCD refines the picture by modifying the shape of the spectrum, to order unity unlike the small modifications naively expected as a result of asymptotic freedom.

Quantum mechanics predicts the number of quark pairs in the photon splitting process to increase logarithmically with the resolution Q, and (approximately) linearly with the momenta x. The characteristic behavior

$$F^\gamma_{2,B}(x,Q^2) = f_B(x)\log{ Q^2/\Lambda^2} + ...$$

with

$$f_B(x) = \frac{3 \alpha}{2\pi}\sum_{q,\bar{q}}e_q^4 x [x^2+(1-x)^2]$$

is predicted for the photon structure function in the quark model to leading logarithmic behavior; where α is the fine-structure constant and the fractional quark charges are denoted e_{q}; with the factor 3 accounting for the quark color degrees. Turning on the radiation of gluon quanta off quarks in QCD, the quark momenta are reshuffled partly from large to small x values with increasing resolution. At the same time the radiation is damped moderately due to asymptotic freedom. The delicate interplay between photon splitting and damped gluon radiation re-normalizes the photon structure function

$$F^\gamma_{2,B}(x,Q^2)\rightarrow F^\gamma_2(x,Q^2) = f(x) \log{ Q^2 / \Lambda^2 }$$

to order unity, leaving the logarithmic behavior in the resolution Q untouched apart from superficially introducing the fundamental QCD scale Λ, but tilting the shape of the structure function f_{B} (x) → f (x) by damping the momentum spectrum at large x. These characteristics, dramatically different from the proton parton density, are unique features of the photon structure function within QCD. They are the origin of the excitement associated with the photon structure function.

While electron scattering off photons maps out the quarks' spectra, the electrically neutral gluon content of the photons can best be analyzed by jet pair production in photon–proton scattering. Gluons as components of the photon may scatter off gluons residing in the proton, and generate two hadron jets in the final state. The complexity of these scattering processes, due to the superposition of many subprocesses, renders the analysis of the gluon content of the photon quite complicated.

The quantitative representation of the photon structure function introduced above is strictly valid only for asymptotically high resolution Q, i.e. the logarithm of Q being much larger than the logarithm of the quark masses. However, the asymptotic behavior is approached steadily with increasing Q for x away from zero as demonstrated next. In this asymptotic regime the photon structure function is predicted uniquely in QCD to logarithmic accuracy.

== Experimental analyses ==
Up to now the photon structure function has only been investigated experimentally by electron scattering off a beam of quasi-real photons. The experiments use the so-called two-photon reactions at electron–positron colliders e^{−}e^{+} → e^{−}e^{+}+ h, where h represents all the remaining hadrons in the final state. The kinematics chosen is characterized by the electron scattered at large angles and the positron at very small angles thus providing a calculable flux of quasi-real photons (Weizsäcker–Williams approximation). The cross section for electron–photon scattering is then analyzed in terms of the photon structure function quite analogously to studies of the nucleon structure in electron–nucleon scattering.

In order to ensure a small virtual mass of the target photon one uses the so-called anti-tagging. Special forward detectors are arranged down to small angles close to the beam pipe. Events with a positron signal in these detectors are eliminated from the analysis. By contrast, events with the positrons travelling undetected down the beam pipe, are accepted. The energy of the emitted quasi-real target photon is unknown. Whereas the four-momentum transfer squared Q^{2} can be determined alone from the energy and angle of the scattered electron, x has to be calculated from Q^{2} and the invariant mass M_{h} of the hadronic system using x = Q^{2} / (Q^{2} + M_{h}^{2}) . The experimental situation is thus comparable to neutrino–nucleon scattering where the unknown energy of the incoming neutrino also requires the determination of M_{h} for calculating the kinematical parameters of the neutrino quark scattering process.

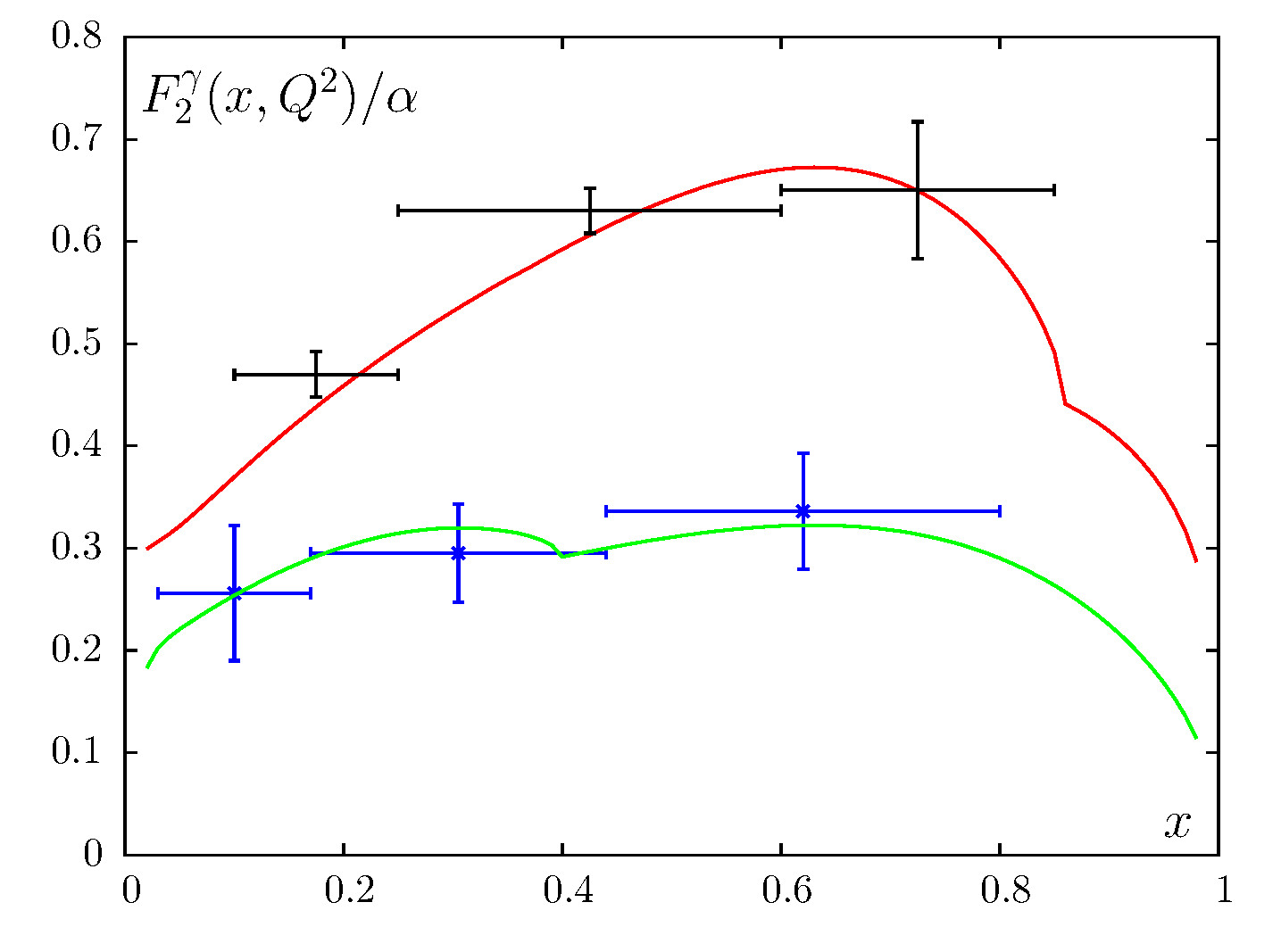
Fig 2: Measured photon structure function versus x for Q^{2} = 4.3 GeV^{2} (blue crosses) and 39.7 GeV^{2} (black crosses) compared to the QCD prediction (red, green) explained in the text.

The hadronic system produced in two-photon reactions has in general a rather high momentum along the beam direction resulting in small hadronic scattering angles. This kinematic feature again requires special forward detectors. A high efficiency in reconstructing hadronic events is now also essential. Nevertheless, losses of hadronic energy are practically unavoidable and the real hadronic energy is therefore determined using sophisticated unfolding techniques.

The first measurement of the photon structure function has been performed using the detector PLUTO at the DESY storage ring PETRA followed subsequently by many investigations at all large electron–positron colliders. A comprehensive discussion of data and theory can be found in reviews of 2000 and 2014. It is customary to display the structure function in units of the fine-structure constant α . The basic theoretical features discussed above are impressively verified by the data. The increase of F_{2}^{γ}(x, Q^{2}) with x, shown in Fig. 2 at Q^{2} = 4.3 GeV^{2} and 39.7 GeV^{2}, is obviously quite different from the behaviour of the proton structure function, which falls with rising x, and it demonstrates nicely the influence of the photon splitting to quark pairs. The predicted log Q^{2} dependence of F_{2}^{γ}(x, Q^{2}) is clearly demonstrated in Fig. 3, here plotted for data with 0.3 < x < 0.5 .

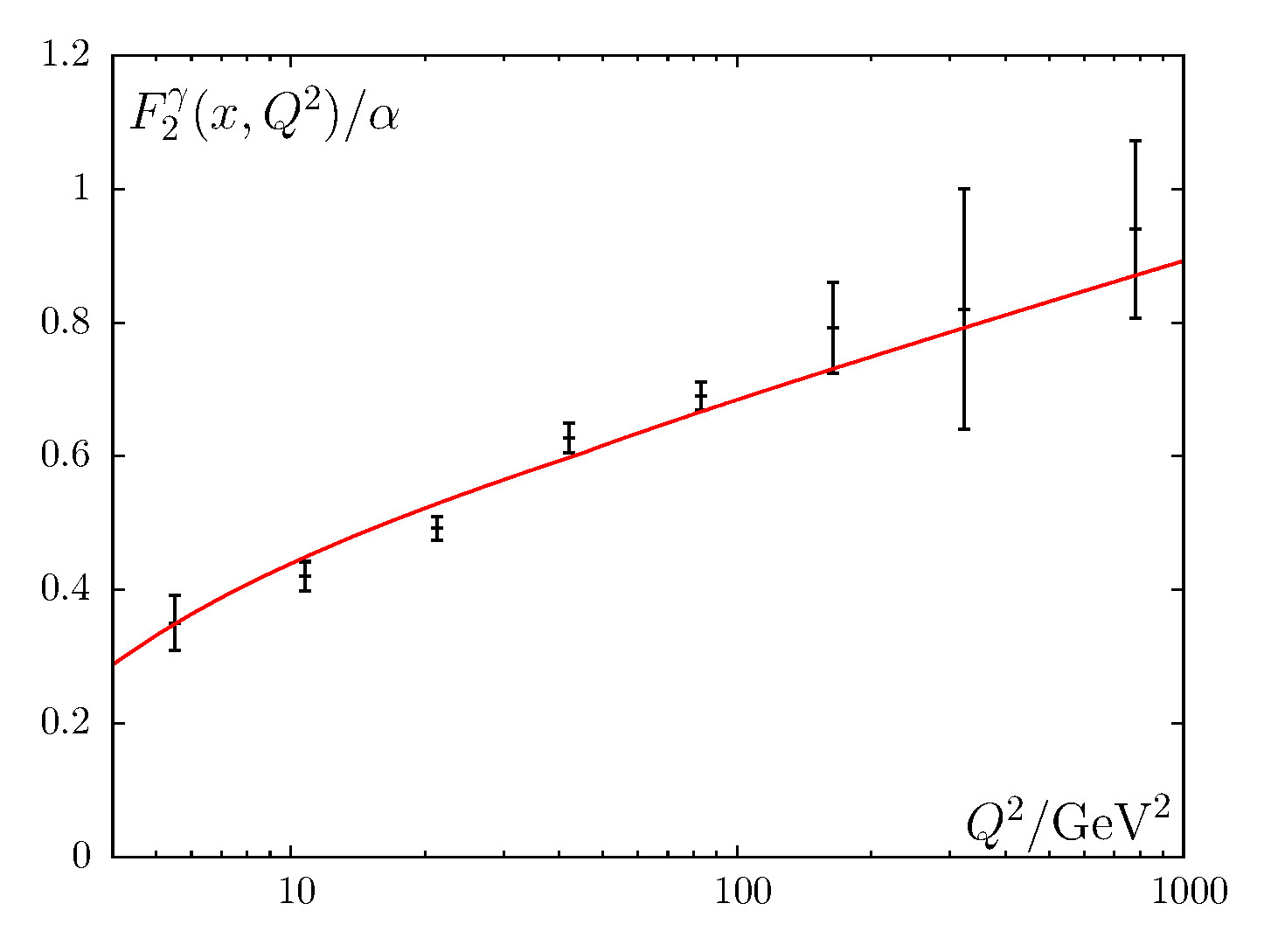
Fig 3: Measured photon structure function (black crosses) versus log Q^{2} for 0.3 < x < 0.5 compared to the QCD prediction (red) explained in the text.

In both figures the data are compared to theoretical calculations, the curves representing the analysis of photon structure function data based on the standard higher-order QCD prediction for three light quarks supplemented by the charm quark contribution and a residual hadronic component accounted for by vector meson dominance. The numerical values were calculated using Λ = 0.338 GeV and a charm quark mass of 1.275 GeV. (Note: See reference for details of the data selection and the theoretical model.)

One might be tempted to use the data for a precision measurement of Λ . However, while the asymptotic solution, defined properly at higher order, appears superficially very sensitive to Λ , spurious singularities at small x require either technical ad-hoc regularizations or the switching to the evolution from pre-fixed initial conditions at small Q^{2} . Both techniques reduce the sensitivity to Λ . Nevertheless, values of

$$\alpha_\mathsf{s}\!\!\left( M_\mathsf{Z} \right) = 0.1198 \pm 0.0028 {}_\mathsf{\ [\ expmt.\ err.]\ } \pm 0.0040 {}_\mathsf{\ [\ theor.\ err.]\ }$$

in analyses of the QCD coupling along these lines agree well with other experimental methods.

It is remarkable to realize that even a single parameter (Λ) fit performed to all data with x > 0.45 , Q^{2} > 59 GeV^{2} or to all data with x > 0.1 leads to very similar results for α_{s}(M_{Z}) .

== See also ==
- Proton structure function
