= Quantum mechanical scattering of photon and nucleus =

In pair production, a photon creates an electron positron pair. In the process of photons scattering in air (e.g. in lightning discharges), the most important interaction is the scattering of photons at the nuclei of atoms or molecules. The full quantum mechanical process of pair production can be described by the quadruply differential cross section given here:

$$\begin{align}
d^4\sigma &=
\frac{Z^2\alpha_\textrm{fine}^3c^2}{(2\pi)^2\hbar}|\mathbf{p}_+||\mathbf{p}_-|
\frac{dE_+}{\omega^3}\frac{d\Omega_+ d\Omega_- d\Phi}{|\mathbf{q}|^4}\times \\
&\times\left[-
\frac{\mathbf{p}_-^2\sin^2\Theta_-}{(E_--c|\mathbf{p}_-|\cos\Theta_-)^2}\left
(4E_+^2-c^2\mathbf{q}^2\right)\right.\\
&-\frac{\mathbf{p}_+^2\sin^2\Theta_+}{(E_+-c|\mathbf{p}_+|\cos\Theta_+)^2}\left
(4E_-^2-c^2\mathbf{q}^2\right)  \\
&+2\hbar^2\omega^2\frac{\mathbf{p}_+^2\sin^2\Theta_++\mathbf{p}_-^2\sin^2\Theta_-}{(E_+-c|\mathbf{p}_+|\cos\Theta_+)(E_--c|\mathbf{p}_-|\cos\Theta_-)} \\
&+2\left.\frac{|\mathbf{p}_+||\mathbf{p}_-|\sin\Theta_+\sin\Theta_-\cos\Phi}{(E_+-c|\mathbf{p}_+|\cos\Theta_+)(E_--c|\mathbf{p}_-|\cos\Theta_-)}\left(2E_+^2+2E_-^2-c^2\mathbf{q}^2\right)\right]. \\
\end{align}$$

with

$$\begin{align}
d\Omega_+&=\sin\Theta_+\ d\Theta_+,\\
d\Omega_-&=\sin\Theta_-\ d\Theta_-.
\end{align}$$

This expression can be derived by using a quantum mechanical symmetry between pair production and Bremsstrahlung.
$Z$ is the atomic number, $\alpha_{fine}\approx 1/137$ the fine structure constant, $\hbar$ the reduced Planck constant and $c$ the speed of light. The kinetic energies $E_{kin,+/-}$ of the positron and electron relate to their total energies $E_{+,-}$ and momenta $\mathbf{p}_{+,-}$ via

$$E_{+,-}=E_{kin,+/-}+m_e c^2=\sqrt{m_e^2 c^4+\mathbf{p}_{+,-}^2 c^2}.$$

Conservation of energy yields

$$\hbar\omega=E_{+}+E_{-}.$$

The momentum $\mathbf{q}$ of the virtual photon between incident photon and nucleus is:

$$\begin{align}
-\mathbf{q}^2&=-|\mathbf{p}_+|^2-|\mathbf{p}_-|^2-\left(\frac{\hbar}{c}\omega\right)^2+2|\mathbf{p}_+|\frac{\hbar}{c}
\omega\cos\Theta_+ +2|\mathbf{p}_-|\frac{\hbar}{c} \omega\cos\Theta_- \\
&-2|\mathbf{p}_+||\mathbf{p}_-|(\cos\Theta_+\cos\Theta_-+\sin\Theta_+\sin\Theta_-\cos\Phi),
\end{align}$$

where the directions are given via:

$$\begin{align}
\Theta_+&=\sphericalangle(\mathbf{p}_+,\mathbf{k}),\\
\Theta_-&=\sphericalangle(\mathbf{p}_-,\mathbf{k}),\\
\Phi&=\text{Angle between the planes } (\mathbf{p}_+,\mathbf{k}) \text{ and } (\mathbf{p}_-,\mathbf{k}),
\end{align}$$

where $\mathbf{k}$ is the momentum of the incident photon.

In order to analyse the relation between the photon energy $E_+$ and the emission angle $\Theta_+$ between photon and positron, Köhn and Ebert integrated the quadruply differential cross section over $\Theta_-$ and $\Phi$. The double differential cross section is:

$$\begin{align}
\frac{d^2\sigma (E_+,\omega,\Theta_+)}{dE_+d\Omega_+} =
\sum\limits_{j=1}^{6} I_j
\end{align}$$

with

$$\begin{align}
I_1&=\frac{2\pi A}{\sqrt{(\Delta^{(p)}_2)^2+4p_+^2p_-^2\sin^2\Theta_+}} \\
&\times
\ln\left(\frac{(\Delta^{(p)}_2)^2+4p_+^2p_-^2\sin^2\Theta_+-\sqrt{(\Delta^{(p)}_2)^2+4p_+^2p_-^2\sin^2
\Theta_+}(\Delta^{(p)}_1+\Delta^{(p)}_2)+\Delta^{(p)}_1\Delta^{(p)}_2}{-(\Delta^{(p)}_2)
^2-4p_+^2p_-^2\sin^2\Theta_+
-\sqrt{(\Delta^{(p)}_2)^2+4p_+^2p_-^2\sin^2 \Theta_+}(\Delta^{(p)}_1-\Delta^{(p)}_2)+\Delta^{(p)}_1\Delta^{(p)}_2
}\right) \\
&\times\left[-1-\frac{c\Delta^{(p)}_2}{p_-(E_+-cp_+\cos\Theta_+)}+\frac{p_+^2c^2\sin^2\Theta_+}
{(E_+-cp_+\cos\Theta_+)^2}-\frac{2\hbar^2\omega^2p_-\Delta^{(p)}_2}{c(E_+-cp_+\cos
\Theta_+)((\Delta^{(p)}_2)^2+4p_+^2p_-^2\sin^2\Theta_+)}\right], \\
I_2&=\frac{2\pi Ac}{p_-(E_+-cp_+\cos\Theta_+)}\ln\left(
\frac{E_-+p_-c}{E_--p_-c}\right), \\
I_3&=\frac{2\pi A}{\sqrt{(\Delta^{(p)}_2E_-+\Delta^{(p)}_1p_-c)^2+4m^2c^4p_+^2p_-^2\sin^2\Theta_+
}}  \\
&\times\ln\Bigg(\Big((E_-+p_-c)(4p_+^2p_-^2\sin^2\Theta_+(E_--p_-c)+(\Delta^{(p)}_1+\Delta^{(p)}_2)
((\Delta^{(p)}_2E_-+\Delta^{(p)}_1p_-c) \\
&-\sqrt{(\Delta^{(p)}_2E_-+\Delta^{(p)}_1p_-c)^2+4m^2c^4p_+^2p_-^2\sin^2\Theta_+}))\Big)\Big((E_--p_-c)
(4p_+^2p_-^2\sin^2\Theta_+(-E_--p_-c) \\
&+(\Delta^{(p)}_1-\Delta^{(p)}_2)
((\Delta^{(p)}_2E_-+\Delta^{(p)}_1p_-c)-\sqrt{(\Delta^{(p)}_2E_-+\Delta^{(p)}_1p_-c)^2+4m^2c^4p_+^2p_-^2\sin^2\Theta_+}))\Big)^{-1}\Bigg)  \\
&\times\left[\frac{c(\Delta^{(p)}_2E_-+\Delta^{(p)}_1p_-c)}{p_-(E_+-cp_+\cos\Theta_+)}\right.\\
&+\Big[((\Delta^{(p)}_2)^2+4p_+^2p_-^2\sin^2\Theta_+)(E_-^3+E_-p_-c)+p_-c(2
((\Delta^{(p)}_1)^2-4p_+^2p_-^2\sin^2\Theta_+)E_-p_-c \\
&+\Delta^{(p)}_1\Delta^{(p)}_2(3E_-^2+p_-^2c^2))\Big]\Big[(\Delta^{(p)}_2E_-+\Delta^{(p)}_1p_-c)^2+4m^2c^4p_+^2p_-^2\sin^2\Theta_+\Big]^{-1} \\
&+\Big[-8p_+^2p_-^2m^2c^4\sin^2\Theta_+(E_+^2+E_-^2)-2\hbar^2\omega^2p_+^2\sin^2\Theta_+p_-c(\Delta^{(p)}_2E_-+\Delta^{(p)}_1p_-c) \\
&+2\hbar^2\omega^2p_- m^2c^3(\Delta^{(p)}_2E_-+\Delta^{(p)}_1p_-c)\Big]
\Big[(E_+-cp_+\cos\Theta_+)((\Delta^{(p)}_2E_-+\Delta^{(p)}_1p_-c)^2+4m^2c^4p_+^2p_-^2\sin^2\Theta_+)\Big]^{-1} \\
&+\left.\frac{4E_+^2p_-^2(2(\Delta^{(p)}_2E_-+\Delta^{(p)}_1p_-c)^2-4m^2c^4p_+^2p_-^2\sin^2\Theta_+)(\Delta^{(p)}_1E_-+\Delta^{(p)}_2p_-c)}{((\Delta^{(p)}_2E_-+\Delta^{(p)}_1p_-c)^2+4m^2c^4p_+^2p_-^2\sin^2\Theta_+)^2}\right], \\
I_4&=\frac{4\pi Ap_-c(\Delta^{(p)}_2E_-+\Delta^{(p)}_1p_-c)}{(\Delta^{(p)}_2E_-+\Delta^{(p)}_1p_-c)^2+4m^2c^4p_+^2p_-^2\sin^2\Theta_+}+\frac{16\pi E_+^2p_-^2
A(\Delta^{(p)}_2E_-+\Delta^{(p)}_1p_-c)^2}{((\Delta^{(p)}_2E_-+\Delta^{(p)}_1p_-c)^2+4m^2c^4p_+^2p_-^2\sin^2\Theta_+)^2}, \\
I_5&=\frac{4\pi A}{(-(\Delta^{(p)}_2)^2+(\Delta^{(p)}_1)^2-4p_+^2p_-^2\sin^2\Theta_+)
((\Delta^{(p)}_2E_-+\Delta^{(p)}_1p_-c)^2+4m^2c^4p_+^2p_-^2\sin^2\Theta_+)} \\
&\times\left[\frac{\hbar^2\omega^2p_-^2}{E_+cp_+\cos\Theta_+}
\Big[E_-[2(\Delta^{(p)}_2)^2((\Delta^{(p)}_2)^2-(\Delta^{(p)}_1)^2)+8p_+^2p_-^2\sin^2\Theta_+((\Delta^{(p)}_2)^2+(\Delta^{(p)}_1)^2)]
\right.\\
&+p_-c[2\Delta^{(p)}_1\Delta^{(p)}_2((\Delta^{(p)}_2)^2-(\Delta^{(p)}_1)^2)+16\Delta^{(p)}_1\Delta^{(p)}_2p_+^2p_-^2\sin^2\Theta_+]\Big]\Big[(\Delta^{(p)}_2)^2+4p_+^2p_-^2\sin^2\Theta_+\Big]^{-1}\\
&+ \frac{2\hbar^2\omega^2 p_{+}^2 \sin^2\Theta_+(2\Delta^{(p)}_1\Delta^{(p)}_2
p_-c+2(\Delta^{(p)}_2)^2E_-+8p_+^2p_-^2\sin^2\Theta_+ E_-)}{E_+-cp_+\cos\Theta_+}\\
&-\Big[2E_+^2p_-^2\{2((\Delta^{(p)}_2)^2-(\Delta^{(p)}_1)^2)(\Delta^{(p)}_2E_-+\Delta^{(p)}_1p_-c)^2
+8p_+^2p_-^2\sin^2\Theta_+[((\Delta^{(p)}_1)^2+(\Delta^{(p)}_2)^2)(E_-^2+p_-^2c^2)\\
&+4\Delta^{(p)}_1\Delta^{(p)}_2E_-p_-c]\}\Big]\Big[(\Delta^{(p)}_2E_-+\Delta^{(p)}_1p_-c)^2+4m^2c^4p_+^2p_-^2\sin^2\Theta_+\Big]^{-1}\\
&-\left.\frac{8p_+^2p_-^2\sin^2\Theta_+(E_+^2+E_-^2)(\Delta^{(p)}_2p_-c +\Delta^{(p)}_1
E_-)}{E_+-cp_+\cos\Theta_+}\right], \\
I_6&=-\frac{16\pi E_-^2p_+^2\sin^2\Theta_+ A}{(E_+-cp_+\cos\Theta_+)^2
(-(\Delta^{(p)}_2)^2+(\Delta^{(p)}_1)^2-4p_+^2p_-^2\sin^2\Theta_+)}
\end{align}$$

and

$$\begin{align}
A&=\frac{Z^2\alpha_{fine}^3c^2}{(2\pi)^2\hbar}\frac{|\mathbf{p}_+||\mathbf{p}_-|}{\omega^3},\\
\Delta^{(p)}_1&:=-|\mathbf{p}_+|^2-|\mathbf{p}_-|^2-\left(\frac{\hbar}{c}\omega\right)
+ 2\frac{\hbar}{c}\omega|\mathbf{p}_+|\cos\Theta_+,\\
\Delta^{(p)}_2&:=2\frac{\hbar}{c}\omega|\mathbf{p}_i|-2|\mathbf{p}_+||\mathbf{p}_-|
\cos\Theta_+ + 2.
\end{align}$$

This cross section can be applied in Monte Carlo simulations. An analysis of this expression shows that positrons are mainly emitted in the direction of the incident photon.
