= Available energy (particle collision) =

In particle physics, the available energy is the energy in a particle collision available to produce new particles from the energy of the colliding particles.

In early accelerators both colliding particles usually survived after the collision, so the available energy was the total kinetic energy of the colliding particles in the center-of-momentum frame before the collision. In modern accelerators particles collide with their anti-particles and can annihilate, so the available energy includes both the kinetic energy and the rest energy of the colliding particles in the center-of-momentum frame before the collision.

== See also ==
- Threshold energy
- Matter creation
