= Matter creation =

How to create matter from fundamentals particles to galaxies

Even restricting the discussion to physics, scientists do not have a unique definition of what matter is. In the currently known particle physics, summarised by the Standard Model of elementary particles and interactions, it is possible to distinguish in an absolute sense particles of matter and particles of antimatter. This is particularly easy for those particles that carry electric charge, such as electrons, protons or quarks, while the distinction is more subtle in the case of neutrinos, elementary particles that do not carry electric charge. In the Standard Model, it is not possible to create a net amount of matter particles—or more precisely, it is not possible to change the net number of leptons or of quarks in any perturbative reaction among particles. This remark is consistent with all existing observations.

However, similar processes are not considered to be impossible and are expected in other models of the elementary particles, that extend the Standard Model. They are necessary in speculative theories that aim to explain the cosmic excess of matter over antimatter, such as leptogenesis and baryogenesis. They could even manifest themselves in laboratory as proton decay or as creations of electrons in the so-called neutrinoless double beta decay. The latter case occurs if the neutrinos are Majorana particles, being at the same time matter and antimatter, according to the definition given just above.

In a wider sense, one can use the word matter simply to refer to fermions. In this sense, matter and antimatter particles (such as an electron and a positron) are identified beforehand. The process inverse to particle annihilation can be called matter creation; more precisely, we are considering here the process obtained under time reversal of the annihilation process. This process is also known as pair production, and can be described as the conversion of light particles (i.e., photons) into one or more massive particles. The most common and well-studied case is the one where two photons convert into an electron–positron pair.

== Photon pair production ==
Because of momentum conservation laws, the creation of a pair of fermions (matter particles) out of a single photon cannot occur. However, matter creation is allowed by these laws when in the presence of another particle (another boson, or even a fermion) which can share the primary photon's momentum. Thus, matter can be created out of two photons.

The law of conservation of energy sets a minimum photon energy required for the creation of a pair of fermions: this threshold energy must be greater than the total rest energy of the fermions created. To create an electron-positron pair, the total energy of the photons, in the rest frame, must be at least 2m_{e}c^{2} = 2 × 0.511 MeV = 1.022 MeV (m_{e} is the mass of one electron and c is the speed of light in vacuum), an energy value that corresponds to soft gamma ray photons. The creation of a much more massive pair, like a proton and antiproton, requires photons with energy of more than 1.88 GeV (hard gamma ray photons).

The first published calculations of the rate of e^{+}–e^{−} pair production in photon-photon collisions were done by Lev Landau in 1934. It was predicted that the process of e^{+}–e^{−} pair creation (via collisions of photons) dominates in collision of ultra-relativistic charged particles—because those photons are radiated in narrow cones along the direction of motion of the original particle, greatly increasing photon flux.

In high-energy particle colliders, matter creation events have yielded a wide variety of exotic heavy particles precipitating out of colliding photon jets (see two-photon physics). Currently, two-photon physics studies creation of various fermion pairs both theoretically and experimentally (using particle accelerators, air showers, radioactive isotopes, etc.).

It is possible to create all fundamental particles in the Standard Model, including quarks, leptons and bosons using photons of varying energies above some minimum threshold, whether directly (by pair production), or by decay of the intermediate particle (such as a W^{−} boson decaying to form an electron and an electron-antineutrino).

As shown above, to produce ordinary baryonic matter out of a photon gas, this gas must not only have a very high photon density, but also be very hot – the energy (temperature) of photons must obviously exceed the rest mass energy of the given matter particle pair. The threshold temperature for production of electrons is about 10^{10} K, 10^{13} K for protons and neutrons, etc. According to the Big Bang theory, in the early universe, mass-less photons and massive fermions would inter-convert freely. As the photon gas expanded and cooled, some fermions would be left over (in extremely small amounts ~10^{−10}) because low energy photons could no longer break them apart. Those left-over fermions would have become the matter that exists today in the universe.

== See also ==
- Annihilation
- Available energy
- Pair production
- Schwinger limit
