= Ana María Cetto =

Mexican physicist and professor

Ana María Cetto Kramis
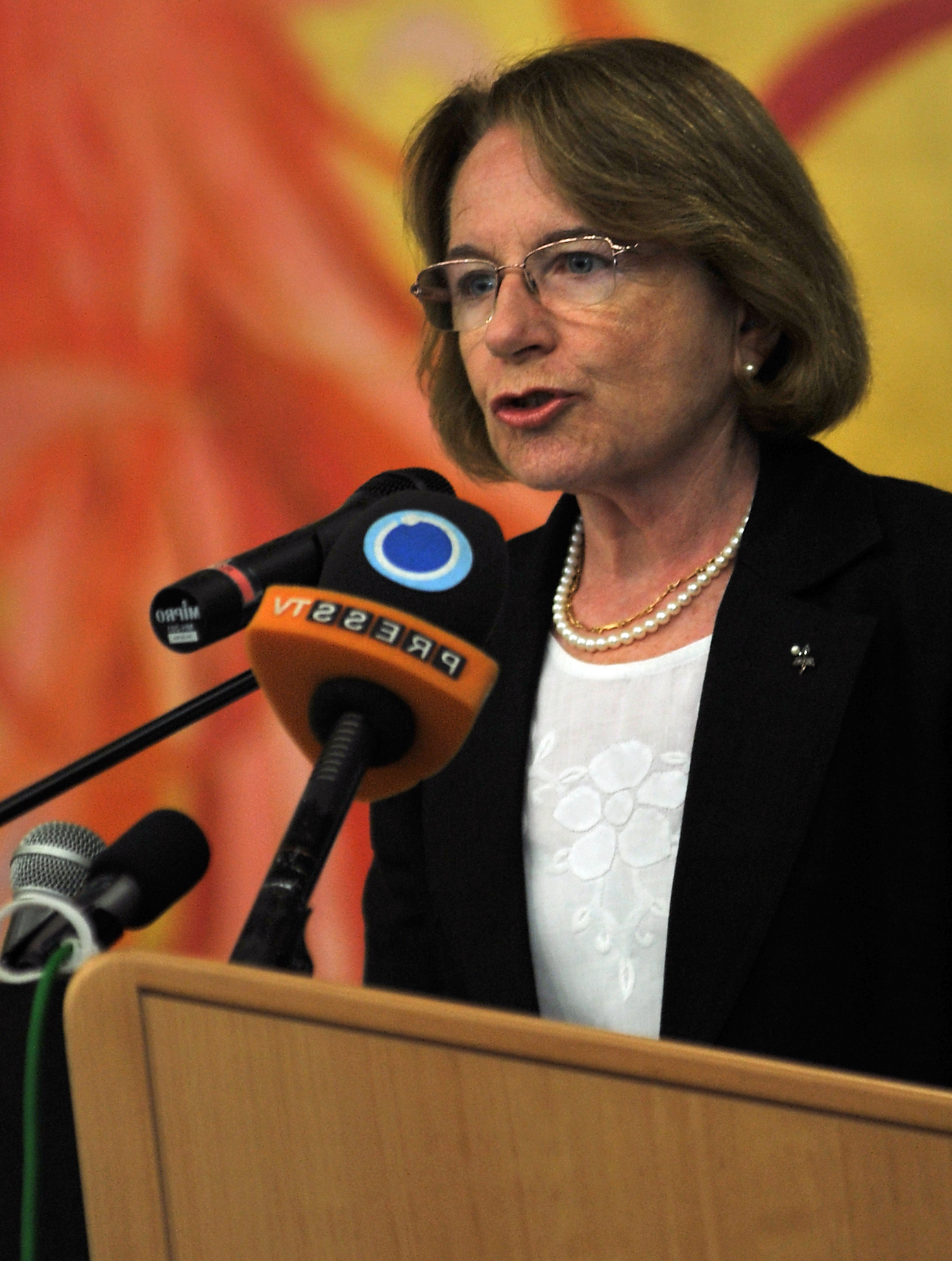
- Ana María Cetto at IAEA Commemorative Ceremony on the Destruction of Hiroshima and Nagasaki, 2010
- Born: 1946 (age 79–80); Mexico City, Mexico
- Education: Harvard University; National Autonomous University of Mexico
- Known for: Stochastic electrodynamics
- Spouse: Luis de la Peña
- Parent(s): Max Cetto and Gertrud Catarina Kramis
- Scientific career
- Fields: Physics
- Workplaces: National Autonomous University of Mexico

Ana María Cetto Kramis (Note: In this Mexican name, the surname is Cetto and the second or maternal family name is Kramis.) (born 1946) is a Mexican physicist and professor. Her work specializes in quantum mechanics, stochastic theory, electrodynamics, and biophysics of light. She is also known for her work as a pacifist and activist for women in science. From 2003 to 2010 she was deputy director general of the International Atomic Energy Agency (IAEA). She was also professor and director at the Faculty of Sciences at the National Autonomous University of Mexico (UNAM), from 1979 to 1982. Cetto Kramis is responsible for several scientific literature programs in Latin America and for several international programs on the promotion and participation of women in physics.

== Early life ==
Ana María Cetto Kramis was born and raised in Mexico City, attending primary and secondary school in the greater Mexico City area. She was raised by her parents Gertrud Katarina Kramis, a Swiss designer, and Max Cetto, a German architect. Her parents were refugees from the Nazi dictatorship. She completed her primary schooling at the German School Alexander von Humboldt of Mexico City, but requested to be transferred to public high school and attended Secondary School No. 8 (named for Tomáš Garrigue Masaryk), in San Pedro de los Pinos. Ultimately, she returned to the German School to complete her two-year preparatory education. Her physics courses were conducted in German, which "presented some challenges for her, as she felt it was not the same as thinking in Spanish."

== Education ==
Ana María Cetto Kramis attended the local National Autonomous University of Mexico (UNAM) for her undergraduate degree. For graduate school, Cetto Kramis relocated to the United States for a master's degree in biophysics at Harvard University. She then returned to UNAM where she obtained a master's degree and research PhD focusing on stochastic theory and quantum mechanics. Cetto Kramis more recently gained honorary doctorates from Tajik State National University (TSNU) from 2007 and the Azerbaijan National Academy of Sciences in 2010.

== National and international work ==
Ana María Cetto Kramis has published over 300 scientific articles on various subjects: stochastic theory, quantum mechanics, and Latin American science advocation. She has also been the director of the Faculty of Sciences at UNAM (1978–1982), as well as a professor, and researcher at the same institution. She was elected president of the executive committee of the Mexican Society of Physics in 2021.

Cetto Kramis has been involved in the management of several international organizations. In 1995, she was council member of the Pugwash Conferences, and in 2002 she was appointed as general secretary of the International Council for Science (ICSU), becoming the first Latin American appointed to the position. Cetto Kramis is also a co-founder and vice-president of the Third World Organization for Women in Science (TWOWS). From 2003 to 2010 she was Deputy Technical Director of the International Atomic Energy Agency (IAEA). She has also been a member of the Governing Board of the United Nations University (UNU) and a counsel president for the International Foundation for Science (IFS).

Cetto Kramis's trajectory has been recognized on various occasions. She was awarded as "Woman of the Year" in Mexico in 2003 for being an "ambassador of physics in Mexico". She has also received several other distinctions as a member of the Third World Academy of Science, the Mexican Academy of Sciences, the Mexican Academy of Physics and the American Physical Society, and as a member of the World Future Council. Cetto Kramis has held several roles in the International Union of Pure and Applied Physics, among others she was chair of the working group on ethics.

In 2015, the University of Guadalajara created the "Ana María Cetto Chair for the Diffusion of Scientific Culture" in recognition of her scientific work. Cetto Kramis has also participated in several international programs aimed at promoting women's participation in science. Because of her advocacy, she received the "Sor Juana Inés de la Cruz" distinction awarded by the UNAM. She is also responsible for the creation of scientific information programs in Latin America, and programs for the promotion and participation of women in science.

Throughout her career, Cetto Kramis has been involved in various initiatives promoting women in science. She is a jury member of the Ada Byron Award, Mexico Chapter, an award created by the University of Deusto to recognize women who work in the fields of science, technology, engineering, and mathematics.

=== Scientific dissemination ===
Another of her lines of work has been the dissemination of scientific content. Cetto Kramis is a directing member of the Revista Mexicana de Física and the founding president of Latindex (Regional Online Information System for Scientific Journals from Latin America, the Caribbean, Spain, and Portugal): a free, open-access, online scholarly journal system created in 1997, containing Spanish translations of scholarly sources. It began as a database of academic journals in Latin America, including ones that were no longer active or focused on scientific communication. The database also established criteria to define what makes a quality journal, based on the historical, cultural, and scientific context of the region, supporting and promoting scientific publication in regional languages.

Currently, Cetto Kramis is part of the foundation board of the Directory of Open Access Journals. She serves as the chair of UNESCO's Scientific Diplomacy & Scientific Heritage, and contributed to the creation of recommendations from UNESCO’s Open Science Committee, which were published in 2021.

=== Museum of Light ===
Cetto Kramis participated in the project focused on the creation of the Museum of Light in Mexico City. The Museum of Light is a thematic museum of the General Directorate for the Dissemination of Science of UNAM, and was inaugurated in 1996. Cetto Kramis was in charge of its renovation in 2016. She was also a promoter of the International Year of Light 2015 and belongs to the International Steering Committee of the International Day of Light.

=== Quantum Research ===
Cetto Kramis has made many contributions to the field of quantum mechanics in recent years. In 2022 she published a paper explaining the role of vacuum fields in quantum mechanics. She also contributed to the derivation of fundamental commutation relations.

Working closely with her husband Luis de la Peña, Cetto Kramis authored many papers on foundational quantum mechanics after her attempts to study biophysics and photosynthesis at the Consejo Nacional de Ciencia y Tecnologia in 1970. In 1971, she defended her doctoral thesis entitled Investigaciones sobre una teoría estocástica de la mecánica cuántica (Investigations of a stochastics theory of quantum mechanics) and became the first woman to earn a Ph.D. in physics in Mexico.

From 2008 to 2021, Cetto Kramis and De la Peña published many papers with co-author Andrea Valdés-Hernández, one of de la Peña's former Ph.D. students. Valdés-Hernández made noteworthy contributions to their studies on quantum entanglement.

== Awards and honors ==
Ana María Cetto Kramis's work has been related to the Nobel Peace Prize on two different occasions. While on the council of Pugwash Conferences in 1995, the organization received the Nobel Peace Prize. The prize was granted for "their efforts to diminish the part played by nuclear arms in international politics and, in the longer run, to eliminate such arms". From 2003 to 2010 she was deputy director general and head of the technical cooperation department of the International Atomic Energy Agency (IAEA) dedicated to the control of the proliferation of nuclear weapons. The IAEA was awarded the Nobel Peace Prize in 2005 for "their effort to prevent nuclear energy from being used for military purposes and to ensure that nuclear energy for peaceful purposes is used in the safest possible way".

=== List of awards and honors ===
Ana María Cetto Kramis's work has been recognized with several other distinctions, including the following:

- Golden Award from the International League of Humanists (1998)
- Prize for the Development of Physics from the Mexican Society of Physics (2000)
- Honorary doctorate from the Tajik National University (2007)
- Second place in the Award for Mexican Women Inventors and Innovators for the Latindex Project (2008)
- Juchimán Silver Prize in Science and Technology 2010, Mexico, (2011)
- Physics Research Prize (2012)
- Selected as one of the thirteen women for the "Woman and Science: 13 Names to Change the World" Exhibition (2013)
- Included among the 50 most outstanding women in Mexico by Forbes México magazine (2015)
- International Festival of Mayan Culture (FICMAYA) Gold Medal (2017)
- UNESCO Kalinga Prize (2023)
- American Institute of Physics Tate Medal for International Leadership in Physics (2025)

== Personal life ==
Cetto currently resides in Mexico City and was married to her long time mentor from the National Autonomous University of Mexico (UNAM), physicist Luis de la Peña, until his death in 2026. They had one daughter.

== Selected work ==
=== Selected articles ===
1. Ceccon E, Cetto AM. Capacity building for sustainable development: some Mexican perspectives. INTERNATIONAL JOURNAL OF SUSTAINABLE DEVELOPMENT AND WORLD ECOLOGY 10 (4): 345-352 DEC 2003
2. De la Pena L, Cetto AM. Planck's law as a consequence of the zeropoint radiation field REVISTA MEXICANA DE FÍSICA 48: 1-8 Suppl. 1 SEP 2002
3. De la Pena L, Cetto AM. Quantum theory and linear stochastic electrodynamics. FOUNDATIONS OF PHYSICS 31 (12): 1703-1731 DEC 2001
4. Vessuri H, Cetto AM. "Pertinence" and "impact". INTERCIENCIA 24 (3): 146-150 MAY-JUN 1999
5. Cetto AM, Alonso-Gamboa O. Scientific periodicals in Latin America and the Caribbean: A global perspective. INTERCIENCIA 23 (2): 84-+ MAR-APR 1998
6. De la Pena L, Cetto AM. Estimate of Planck's constant from an electromagnetic Mach principle. FOUNDATIONS OF PHYSICS LETTERS 10 (6): 591-598 DEC 1997
7. Cetto, A.M., Valdés-Hernández, A. & De la Peña, L. On the Spin Projection Operator and the Probabilistic Meaning of the Bipartite Correlation Function. Found Phys 50, 27–39 (2020). https://doi.org/10.1007/s10701-019-00313-8
8. Cetto, A. M., & De la Peña, L. (2022). The Electromagnetic Vacuum Field as an Essential Hidden Ingredient of the Quantum-Mechanical Ontology. Entropy (Basel, Switzerland), 24(12), 1717. https://doi.org/10.3390/e24121717
9. Cetto Kramis, Ana Maria (2022). "Electron Spin Correlations: Probabilistic Description and Geometric Representation". Entropy. 24 (10): 1439. Bibcode:2022Entrp..24.1439C. doi:10.3390/e24101439. PMC 9601821. PMID 37420458.

=== Books ===
- Cetto, Ana María. La luz en la naturaleza y en el laboratorio. México, D.F.: Sep-Fondo de Cultura Económica : Conacyt, 1987. Serie La ciencia desde México; 32.
- de la Peña, Luis; Cetto, Ana María (1996). van der Merwe, Alwyn (ed.). The Quantum Dice: An Introduction to Stochastic Electrodynamics. Dordrecht; Boston; London: Kluwer Academic Publishers. doi:10.1007/978-94-015-8723-5. ISBN 0-7923-3818-9. LCCN 95040168. OCLC 832537438.
- de la Peña, Luis; Cetto, Ana María; Valdés-Hernández, Andrea (2016). The Emerging Quantum: The Physics Behind Quantum Mechanics. Springer. doi:10.1007/978-3-319-07893-9. ISBN 978-3-319-34792-9. OCLC 957533055.
