= Luis de la Peña =

Mexican physicist (1931–2026)

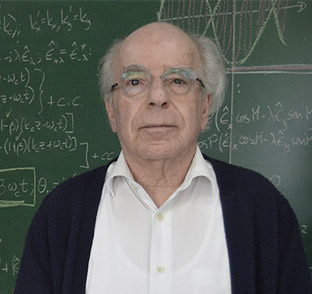
- Born: 23 July 1931; Texmelucan, Puebla, Mexico
- Died: 17 May 2026 (aged 94); Mexico City
- Education: National Polytechnic Institute; Moscow State University (PhD, 1964)
- Known for: Stochastic electrodynamics
- Spouse: Ana María Cetto
- Awards: National Prize for Arts and Sciences
- Scientific career
- Fields: Physics
- Workplaces: National Autonomous University of Mexico
- Doctoral advisor: Arseny Sokolov

Luis Fernando de la Peña Auerbach (Note: In this Mexican name, the surname is de la Peña and the second or maternal family name is Auerbach.) (23 July 1931 – 17 May 2026), known as Luis de la Peña, was a Mexican physicist. He was a researcher of the Institute of Physics and professor of the Faculty of Sciences of the National Autonomous University of Mexico (UNAM) and was a member of the Science Advisory Council of the Presidency of Mexico.

== Life and career ==
De la Peña was born in San Martín Texmelucan, Puebla, in 1931. He graduated from ESIME of the National Polytechnic Institute (IPN) with a degree in mechanical-electrical engineering and began his professional activity as a designer of audio systems. From 1954 was professor of the ESIME and from 1958 definitively joined UNAM. He completed his PhD in 1964 under the direction of Arseny Sokolov at Moscow State University in the Soviet Union.

He is known most for his contributions towards the field of stochastic electrodynamics (SED). In 2002 he was awarded the National Prize for Arts and Sciences in the Physics, Mathematics, and Natural Sciences category.

De la Peña died in Mexico City on 17 May 2026, at the age of 94.

== Selected publications ==
=== Papers ===
- de la Peña, L. (1967). "A Simple Derivation of the Schrödinger Equation From the Theory of Markov processes". Physics Letters A. 24 (11): 603–604. Bibcode:1967PhLA...24..603D. doi:10.1016/0375-9601(67)90639-1. ISSN 0375-9601.

=== Books ===
- de la Peña, Luis; Cetto, Ana María (1996). van der Merwe, Alwyn (ed.). The Quantum Dice: An Introduction to Stochastic Electrodynamics. Dordrecht; Boston; London: Kluwer Academic Publishers. doi:10.1007/978-94-015-8723-5. ISBN 0-7923-3818-9. LCCN 95040168. OCLC 832537438.
- de la Peña, Luis; Cetto, Ana María; Valdés-Hernández, Andrea (2016). The Emerging Quantum: The Physics Behind Quantum Mechanics. Springer. doi:10.1007/978-3-319-07893-9. ISBN 978-3-319-34792-9. OCLC 957533055.
