= Gravitational shielding =

Hypothetical shielding of an object from gravity

Gravitational shielding is a hypothetical process of shielding an object from the influence of a gravitational field. Such processes, if they existed, would have the effect of reducing the weight of an object. The shape of the shielded region would be similar to a shadow from the gravitational shield. For example, the shape of the shielded region above a disk would be conical. The height of the cone's apex above the disk would vary directly with the height of the shielding disk above the Earth. Experimental evidence to date indicates that no such effect exists. Gravitational shielding is considered to be a violation of the equivalence principle and therefore inconsistent with both Newtonian theory and general relativity.

The concept of gravity shielding is a common concept in science fiction literature, especially for space travel. One of the first and best known examples is the fictional gravity shielding substance cavorite that appears in H. G. Wells' classic 1901 novel The First Men in the Moon. Wells was promptly criticized for using it by Jules Verne.

== Tests of the equivalence principle ==
As of 2008, no experiment was successful in detecting positive shielding results. To quantify the amount of shielding, at the beginning of 20th century Quirino Majorana suggested an extinction coefficient h that modifies Newton's gravitational force law as follows:

$$F = \frac{GMm}{r^2} e^{-h \int \rho(r) dr}$$

The best laboratory measurements have established an upper bound limit for shielding of 4.3×10^{−15} m^{2}/kg. The best estimate based on the most accurate gravity anomaly data during the 1997 solar eclipse has provided a new constraint on the shielding parameter 6×10^{−19} m^{2}/kg. However, astronomical observations impose much more stringent limits. Based on lunar observations available in 1908, Poincaré established that h can be no greater than 10^{−18} m^{2}/kg. Subsequently, this bound has been greatly improved. Eckhardt showed that lunar ranging data implies an upper bound of 10^{−22} m^{2}/kg, and Williams, et al., have improved this to h = (3 ± 5)×10^{−22} m^{2}/kg. Note that the value is smaller than the uncertainty. The consequence of the negative results of those experiments (which are in good agreement with the predictions of general relativity) is, that every theory which contains shielding effects like Le Sage's theory of gravitation, must reduce those effects to an undetectable level. For a review of the current experimental limits on possible gravitational shielding, see the survey article by Bertolami, et al. Also, for a discussion of recent observations during solar eclipses, see the paper by Unnikrishnan et al.

== Majorana's experiments and Russell's criticism ==
Some shielding experiments were conducted in the early 20th century by Quirino Majorana. Majorana claimed to have measured positive shielding effects. Henry Norris Russell's analysis of the tidal forces showed that Majorana's positive results had nothing to do with gravitational shielding. To bring Majorana's experiments following the equivalence principle of General Relativity he proposed a model, in which the mass of a body is diminished by the proximity of another body, but he denied any connection between gravitational shielding and his proposal of mass variation. For another explanation of Majorana's experiments, see Coïsson et al. But Majorana's results could not be confirmed up to this day (see the section above) and Russell's mass variation theory, although meant as a modification of general relativity, is inconsistent with standard physics as well.

== Minority views ==
The consensus view of the scientific community is that gravitational shielding does not exist, but there have been occasional investigations into this topic, such as the 1999 NASA-funded paper that reported negative results. Eugene Podkletnov claimed in two papers, one of which he later withdrew, that objects held above a magnetically levitated, superconducting, rotating disc underwent a reduction of between 0.5 and 2% in weight. Theoreticians have attempted to reconcile Podkletnov's claims with quantum gravity theory. In 2006, a research group funded by ESA claimed to have created a similar device that demonstrated positive results for the production of gravitomagnetism, although it produced only 0.0001 g.

== Electrets ==
In his 1976 paper, Electromagnetism and Gravitation, physicist Edward Teller discussed experimentation with electrets, or materials with a permanent electric dipole moment, near its transition point to discover the transition between dipole states. On July 9, 1997, William Rhodes, an inventor, made a posting on Usenet concerning a discovery of an antigravity effect related to electrets. Also, Dr. Martin Tajmar, a physicist and professor for Space Systems at the Dresden University of Technology has written a paper on propellantless propulsion and makes numerous references to electrets. A patent for a gravitational attenuating material that utilizes an organic based material was made by inventor Ronald J. Kita.

== Einstein–Cartan theory ==
Einstein–Cartan theory seems to allow gravitational shielding.

== See also ==
- Breakthrough Propulsion Physics Program
- Anti-gravity
- Artificial gravity
- Eugene Podkletnov
- Ning Li
- Electromagnetic shielding
