= Museum of Light, Mexico =

Science museum in Mexico City, Mexico

Museum of Light
- Museo de la Luz
- Interactive fullscreen map
- Location: Mérida, Yucatán
- Coordinates: 20.9769°N 89.6136°W
- Type: Science museum
- Website: www.museodelaluz.unam.mx

The Museum of Light (Spanish: Museo de la Luz) is a science museum in Mérida, Yucatán, dedicated to the phenomena of light. It is an extension of the Universum museum, the general science museum of the Universidad Nacional Autónoma de México.

Until 2019, it was located in the former San Ildefonso College in the historic center of Mexico City. It was opened in 1996 originally in the former church of the San Pedro y San Pablo College. However, this building was closed in 2010 in order to convert it into the Museum of the Constitutions.

== Museum ==
The museum explores the different facets of light phenomenon and its relationships to various sciences. There are six major permanent exhibits along with an area to hold workshops. The Nature of Light exhibition explores the basic principles of light with exhibits that demonstrate its physics, the working of mirrors, the electromagnetic spectrum and a darkroom. The Light of the Stars exhibit focuses on the chemistry and other aspects of these celestial bodies and how they are discovered through the light they emit. A World of Colors focuses how colors are generated and perceived as well as how they are taken advantage of in nature. Light in the Arts reflects on how light, the illusion of light and color are used in this field. Light and the Biosphere focuses on how light is important to life, with photosynthesis as the basis for the food chain. The last section is called Vision, which focuses on how eyes work.

== History ==
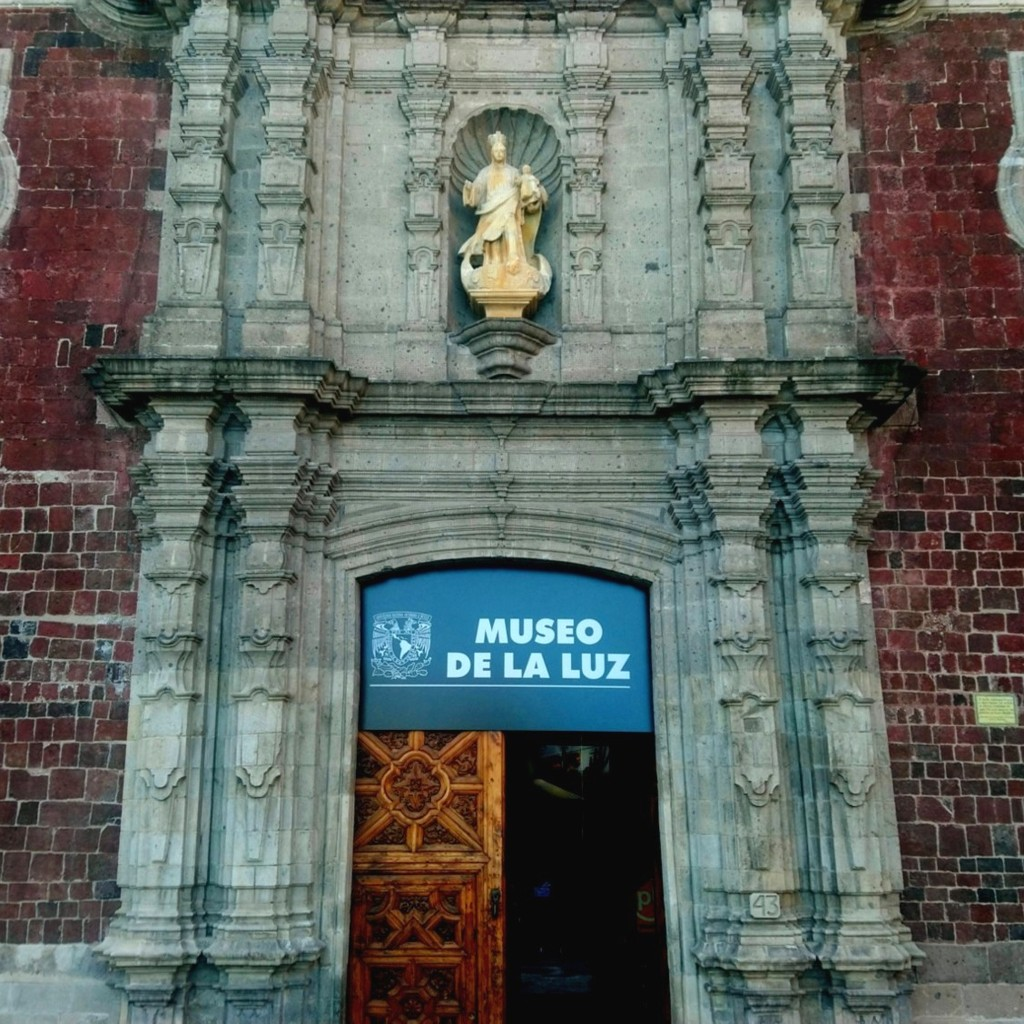
Museum location 2011-2019

The museum was opened in 1996, originally in the former church of the San Pedro y San Pablo College, one block from the current location. This church building was renovated in the mid 1990s for the purpose of the museum after being abandoned for twenty years prior. The idea for the museum was the brainchild of Jorge Flores along with Ana María Cetto and Luis de la Peña, initiated the idea of creating a museum dedicated to electromagnetic radiation, commonly known as light.

In 2010, the decision was made to close the Museum of Light in that location and replace it with a museum dedicated to the various constitutions that Mexico has had since its independence as part of Mexico's Bicentennial of Independence and Centennial of the Revolution. The building was closed in February of that year, and the Museo de las Constitutiones was opened in 2011. After closure, the future of the museum of light was in doubt. One proposal was to merge it into the Universum facility, but this was rejected due to fears that the museum would disappear completely. Instead, in late 2010, the decision was made to move the museum to another building in the historic center of Mexico City also owned by UNAM, the San Ildefonso College. The new space was larger than the former and the museum reopened in 2011.

The Museum of Light was located in the "Colegio Chico" portion of the former San Ildefonso College. It operated as an extension of the Universum museum, the general science museum of the Universidad Nacional Autónoma de México. The museum occupied two floors of the building, with most of the rooms dedicated to permanent exhibits and two others for temporary exhibits and shows.

== Current location in Mérida, Yucatán ==
In 2019, the National Autonomous University of Mexico (UNAM) decided to close the museum and relocate it to the city of Mérida, Yucatán. Construction of the new facility was affected by delays, and allegations of embezzlement emerged during the project. The new museum was inaugurated on November 1, 2023, in a low-profile ceremony attended by UNAM rector Enrique Graue Wiechers and Yucatán Governor Mauricio Vila Dosal, without members of the press present at the event.

== See also ==
- List of Jesuit sites
