= Arseny Sokolov =

Russian theoretical physicist (1910–1986)

- Born: 19 March 1910; Russia, Novosibirsk, Russian Empire
- Died: 19 October 1986 (aged 76); Russia, Moscow, Russian SFSR
- Citizenship: Russia; USSR
- Education: Tomsk State University
- Known for: development of synchrotron radiation theory, Sokolov–Ternov effect
- Awards: USSR State Prize (1976)
- Scientific career
- Fields: Theoretical physics Quantum field theory Elementary particle physics
- Workplaces: Moscow State University
- Doctoral advisor: Piotr Tartakovsky, Dmitri Ivanenko
- Doctoral students: Igor Ternov; Luis de la Peña

Arseny Alexandrovich Sokolov (Russian: Арсе́ний Алекса́ндрович Соколо́в; 19 March 1910 – 19 October 1986) was a Russian theoretical physicist known for the development of synchrotron radiation theory.

== Biography ==
Arseny Sokolov graduated from Tomsk State University (TSU) in 1931. He obtained the degree of Candidate of Sciences (equivalent to PhD) from TSU under supervision of Piotr Tartakovsky (1934). The degree of Doctor of Sciences was obtained by him from Leningrad Ioffe Physico-Technical Institute (1942, at that time in evacuation in Kazan).

Then he moved to Moscow State University (MSU), where he held the positions of the dean of the Faculty of Physics (1948–1954) and the head of the Theoretical Physics Department at the Faculty of Physics (1966–1982). He was a member of the Soviet Communist Party, a dean and secretary of bureau of the Communist Party of the Physics Department of the Moscow State University.

== Research ==
Sokolov's research areas were quantum field theory and elementary particle physics.

- Together with Dmitri Ivanenko he worked on the development of synchrotron radiation theory. His collaboration with Dmitry Ivanenko continued for almost 50 years.
- Together with Igor Ternov he discovered new quantum effects in microscopic particle motion such as Quantum Fluctuations of Electron Trajectories in Accelerators and the Effect of Radiative Polarization of Electrons and Positrons in a Magnetic Field known as the Sokolov–Ternov effect.

== Selected publications ==
=== Books ===
- A. A. Sokolov, I. M. Ternov, Synchrotron Radiation, Elsevier, 1969. ISBN 0-08-012945-5.
- A. A. Sokolov, I. M. Ternov, Synchrotron Radiation from Relativistic Electrons (edited by C. W. Kilmister), American Inst. of Physics, New York, 1986. ISBN 0-88318-507-5.
- A. A. Sokolov, I. M. Ternov, and V. Ch. Zhukovskii, Quantum Mechanics, Imported Pubn., 1986. ISBN 0-8285-2967-1.
- A. A. Sokolov, I. M. Ternov, and V. Ch. Zhukovskii, A. V. Borisov, Quantum Electrodynamics, Mir Publishing Moscow, 1988 ISBN 5-03-000790-3

== Doctoral students ==
- Igor Ternov
- Luis de la Peña

== Awards ==
- Stalin Prize
- USSR State Prize (1976) — for prediction and development of the effect of radiative polarization of electrons and positrons in a magnetic field (with Igor Ternov).
- 2 Orders of the Badge of Honour
- Medal "For Labour Valour"
