= Froissart–Stora equation =

The Froissart–Stora equation describes the change in polarization which a high energy charged particle beam in a storage ring will undergo as it passes through a resonance in the spin tune. It is named after the French physicists Marcel Froissart and Raymond Stora. The polarization following passage through the resonance is given by

$$P_y = P_{y0}\left[2\exp\left({-\frac{\pi|\epsilon|^2}{2\alpha_0}}\right)-1\right]$$

where $\epsilon$ is the resonance strength and $\alpha_0$ is the speed at which the resonance is crossed. $P_{y0}$ is the initial polarization before resonance crossing.

The resonance may be crossed by raising the energy so that the spin tune passes through a resonance, or driven with a transverse magnetic field at a frequency that is in resonance with the spin oscillations.

The Froissart–Stora equation has a direct analogy in condensed matter physics in the Landau–Zener effect.

== Other spin-dynamics effects ==
The original Froissart–Stora equation was derived for polarized protons. It may also be applied to polarized electrons in storage rings. In this case, there are additional polarization effects resulting from the synchrotron radiation. In particular, the Sokolov–Ternov effect describes the polarization due to spin flip radiation. In the case of a non-planar ring, this must be generalized as was done by Derbenev and Kondratenko.
