= Igor Ternov =

Russian physicist (1921–1996)

Igor M. Ternov
- Born: 11 November 1921; Russian SFSR
- Died: April 12, 1996 (aged 74); Moscow, Russia
- Education: Moscow State University
- Known for: codiscovering of the Sokolov–Ternov effect, Dynamic Character of the Electron Anomalous Magnetic Moment and Quantum Fluctuations of Electron Trajectories in Accelerators.
- Awards: USSR State Prize (1976)
- Scientific career
- Fields: Theoretical physics
- Workplaces: Moscow State University
- Doctoral advisor: Arsenij Sokolov

Igor Mikhailovich Ternov (Russian: И́горь Миха́йлович Терно́в; November 11, 1921 – April 12, 1996) was a Russian theoretical physicist, known for discovery of new quantum effects in microscopic particle motion such as Dynamic Character of the Electron Anomalous Magnetic Moment, the Effect of Radiative Polarization of Electrons and Positrons in a Magnetic Field, and Quantum Fluctuations of Electron Trajectories in Accelerators.

== Biography ==
Igor Ternov graduated from Faculty of Physics of Moscow State University (MSU) in 1951, where he spent his entire career. Igor Ternov was one of the leading experts in the theory of synchrotron radiation.

He developed a new field which explained the theory of quantum processes in strong external fields, emerging from exact solutions of relativistic wave equations. He was the chairman of MSU Physical Society, the vice-rector of MSU, the head of Quantum Theory and of Theoretical Physics departments of the MSU Faculty of Physics.

In 1976 he received the USSR State Prize (1976) for prediction and development of the effect of radiative polarization of electrons and positrons in a magnetic field. Igor Ternov was a member of the Soviet Communist Party, a vice-rector and secretary of bureau of Communist Party of the Physics Department of the Moscow State University.

== See also ==
- Sokolov–Ternov effect
- Synchrotron light source

== Publications ==
He is author of more than 300 scientific papers, 5 monographs, and 10 textbooks.

Books

1. A. A. Sokolov, I. M. Ternov, Synchrotron Radiation, Elsevier, 1969. ISBN 0-08-012945-5.
2. A. A. Sokolov, I. M. Ternov, Synchrotron Radiation from Relativistic Electrons (edited by C. W. Kilmister), American Inst. of Physics, New York, 1986. ISBN 0-88318-507-5.
3. I. M. Ternov, V. V. Mikhailin, V. R. Khalilov, Synchrotron Radiation and Its Application, Harwood Acad. Publ., Chur, Switzerland, 1968.
4. A. A. Sokolov, I. M. Ternov, and V. Ch. Zhukovskii, Quantum Mechanics, Imported Pubn., 1986. ISBN 0-8285-2967-1.

Papers

- Arsenij A. Sokolov and I. M. Ternov (1953). Zh. Eksp. Teor. Fiz. 25: 698. In this work the effect of quantum fluctuations of electron trajectories in accelerators is predicted.
- Sokolov, A. A.; I. M. Ternov (1963). О поляризационных и спиновых эффектах в теории синхротронного излучения [Polarization and spin effects in the theory of synchrotron radiation]. Doklady Akademii Nauk SSSR (in Russian). 153 (5): 1052–1053.
- A. A. Sokolov and I. M. Ternov (1964). "On Polarization and Spin Effects in Synchrotron Radiation Theory". Sov. Phys. Dokl. 8: 1203.
