= Scharnhorst effect =

Hypothesized phenomenon in quantum field theory

The Scharnhorst effect is a hypothetical phenomenon in which light signals travel slightly faster than c between two closely spaced conducting plates. It was first predicted in a 1990 paper by Klaus Scharnhorst of the Humboldt University of Berlin, Germany. He showed using quantum electrodynamics that the effective refractive index n, at low frequencies, in the space between the plates was less than 1. Gabriel Barton and Scharnhorst in 1993 claimed that either signal velocity can exceed c or that the imaginary part of n is negative.

== Explanation ==
Vacuum fluctuations exist even in a perfect vacuum. The vacuum fluctuations are influenced by conducting plates nearby. As a photon travels through a vacuum its propagation is influenced by these vacuum fluctuations.

A prediction made by this assertion is that the speed of a photon will be increased if it travels between two Casimir plates. The ultimate effect would be to increase the apparent speed of that photon. The closer the plates are, the stronger the change in the vacuum fluctuations, and the higher the speed of light.

The effect, however, is predicted to be minuscule. A photon traveling between two plates that are 1 micrometer apart would increase the photon's speed by only about one part in 10^{36}. This change in light's speed is too small to be detected with current technology, which prevents the Scharnhorst effect from being tested at this time.

== Causality ==
The possibility of superluminal photons has caused concern because it might allow for the violation of causality by sending information faster than c. However, several authors (including Scharnhorst) argue that the Scharnhorst effect cannot be used to create causal paradoxes.
