= Stochastic electrodynamics =

Variation of classical electrodynamics

Stochastic electrodynamics (SED) extends classical electrodynamics (CED) of theoretical physics by adding the hypothesis of a classical Lorentz invariant radiation field having statistical properties similar to that of the electromagnetic zero-point field (ZPF) of quantum electrodynamics (QED).

== Key ingredients ==
Stochastic electrodynamics combines two conventional classical ideas – electromagnetism derived from point charges obeying Maxwell's equations and particle motion driven by Lorentz forces – with one unconventional hypothesis: the classical field has radiation even at T=0. This zero-point radiation is inferred from observations of the (macroscopic) Casimir effect forces at low temperatures. As temperature approaches zero, experimental measurements of the force between two uncharged, conducting plates in a vacuum do not go to zero as classical electrodynamics would predict. Taking this result as evidence of classical zero-point radiation leads to the stochastic electrodynamics model.

== History ==
Stochastic electrodynamics is a term for a collection of research efforts of many different styles based on the hypothesis that there exists a Lorentz invariant random electromagnetic radiation. The work of Marshall (1963) and Timothy Boyer, on stochastic electrodynamics can be viewed building spontaneous emission into a semiclassical theory.

Timothy Boyer, author of many papers in the field, has noted that some of papers on the subject contain exaggerated claims or errors.

== Scope of SED ==
SED has been used in attempts to provide a classical explanation for effects previously considered to require quantum mechanics (here restricted to the Schrödinger equation and the Dirac equation and QED) for their explanation. It has also motivated a classical ZPF-based underpinning for gravity and inertia. There is no universal agreement on the successes and failures of SED, either in its congruence with standard theories of quantum mechanics, QED, and gravity or in its compliance with observation. The following SED-based explanations are relatively uncontroversial and are free of criticism at the time of writing:

- The Van der Waals force
- Diamagnetism
- The Unruh effect

The following SED-based calculations and SED-related claims are more controversial, and some have been subject to published criticism:

- The ground state of the harmonic oscillator
- The ground state of the hydrogen atom
- De Broglie waves
- Inertia
- Gravitation

== See also ==
- Classical unified field theories – Theoretical attempts to unify the forces of nature
- Stochastic quantum mechanics – Interpretation of quantum mechanics
- Zero-point energy – Lowest possible energy of a quantum system or field
