= De la Peña =

Peña
Origin
- Meaning: near a cliff
- Region of origin: Burgos, Castile

Peña is a topographic surname originally given to someone living near a cliff. It is the 2,469th most common surname in the world and is most prevalent in the United States.

== History ==
The origin of the surname Peña is in present-day Galicia, Spain. It derives from the word "penna," which typically describes a prominent rock or fortress.

== Notable people with the name ==
- Captain General Don Manuel la Peña fl.(1808–1811), sometimes referred to as Lapeña, was a Spanish military officer who served during the Peninsular War (Guerra de la Independencia Española).
- Don Manuel de la Peña y Peña (1789–1850) was a Mexican politician and lawyer, interim president of Mexico from September to November 1847 and president from January 1848 to June 1848.
- Don Lucas de Zafra-Vazquez y Tallada, de la Plaza y de la Peña, Marquess de los Arenales, Señor de Castril in Granada.
- Don Ramón María del Valle-Inclán y de la Peña, Marquess de Bradomin, (1866–1936) was a Spanish dramatist, novelist and member of the Spanish Generation of 98.
- Don Gaspar Castellano y de la Peña, Count de Castellano, was a Spanish author.
- Don José González de la Peña y Rodríguez de la Encina, Barón de Forna (1887–1961) was a Spanish portrait painter and artist, and consul general of Spain in Venezuela.
- Luis Sáenz Peña (1822–1907), President of Argentina (1892–1895)
- Roque Sáenz Peña (1851–1914), President of Argentina (1910–1914)
- Pedro Pablo Peña Cañete (1864–1943), President of Paraguay (1912)
- Stefan de la Peña fl. (1969–2004), intellectual and philosopher of epistemology
- Don Alfonso Peña Boeuf (1888–1966) was Minister of Transport in the Spanish Government (1938–1945) during the Francoist State
- Don Ricardo Enrique Pallasa de la Peña III (1853–1898), Barón de Azucar and General of the Spanish Naval fleet in the Philippines (1893–1898)
- Don Pedro Juan de la Peña (1855–1945), personal chef to King Alfonso XIII (1885–1905)
- José Manuel Castañón de la Peña (1920–2001), was a Spanish writer born in Pola de Lena (Asturias) who lived in exile in Venezuela during the Francoist State.
- Adam de la Peña, American voice actor, comedy writer, producer, and director.

== Bibliography ==
- Elenco de grandezas y títulos nobiliarios españoles 2006 (Ampelio Alonso de Cadenas y López/Hidalguía)
- Blasonario de la consanguinidad ibérica 1980
