= Alwyn Van der Merwe =

American theoretical physicist

Alwyn van der Merwe (born November 1927 in South Africa) is an American theoretical physicist. He is Emeritus Professor of Physics in the Department of Physics and Astronomy, University of Denver.

== Life and career ==
He attended the University of Stellenbosch, completing his bachelor's degree in 1947 and master's degree in 1949 with summa cum laude honors.

Van der Merwe studied theoretical physics at the University of Amsterdam under Professors Jan de Boer (Jan de Boer was not born yet when Merwe did phd) .and S. A. Wouthuysen and received doctorates from the University of Amsterdam and, later, the University of Bern, where he graduated summa cum laude.

He taught applied mathematics at the University of Natal in Pietermaritzburg, South Africa, first as lecturer then as senior lecturer.

Alwyn van der Merwe was a research associate of professor of physics and natural philosophy Henry Margenau at Yale University and professor Hans Jensen at the University of Heidelberg.

His first appointment in the United States was at Carleton College, in Northfield, Minnesota.

He then became an assistant professor at Queens College, City University of New York (CUNY).

He stayed on for two years at CUNY until he was offered an associate professorship in 1964 (and a full professorship a few years later) at the University of Denver (DU).

He has acted extensively as editor in theoretical physics and the philosophy of science. In 1988 van der Merwe became the founding editor of the journal Foundations of Physics Letters, until its incorporation in 2007 into its sister journal Foundations of Physics, of which he succeeded Margenau as co-editor in 1975.

== Education ==
B.Sc. University of Stellenbosch, R.S.A. (1947) (summa cum laude), M.Sc. University of Stellenbosch, R.S.A. (1949) (summa cum laude) Ph.D. University of Amsterdam (1954) and University of Bern (1971) (summa cum laude).

== Selected publications ==
- Yourgrau, Wolfgang; Merwe, Alwyn van der; Raw, Gough (20 February 2013). Treatise on Irreversible and Statistical Thermodynamics: An Introduction to Nonclassical Thermodynamics. Courier Corporation. ISBN 9780486151090. (Dover reprint of 1966 original)

As editor:

- Wolfgang Yourgrau; Alwyn Van der Merwe (15 November 1971). Perspectives in quantum theory: essays in honor of Alfred Landé. MIT Press. ISBN 978-0-262-24014-7.
- Merwe, Alwyn Van der; Selleri, Franco; Tarozzi, G. (February 1988). Microphysical Reality and Quantum Formalism: Proceedings of the Conference Microphysical Reality and Quantum Formalism, Urbino, Italy; September 25th-October 3rd, 1985. Springer. ISBN 9789027726834.
- Mugur-Schächter, Mioara; Merwe, Alwyn van der (31 January 2003). Quantum Mechanics, Mathematics, Cognition and Action: Proposals for a Formalized Epistemology. Springer. ISBN 9781402011207.
- Adamenko, Stanislav; Selleri, Franco; Merwe, Alwyn van der (17 April 2007). Controlled Nucleosynthesis: Breakthroughs in Experiment and Theory. Springer. ISBN 9781402058745.
- P. Barut; Alwyn van der Merwe (6 December 2012). Selected Scientific Papers of Alfred Landé. Springer Science & Business Media. ISBN 978-94-009-3981-3. (pbk reprint of 1988 original)
- Augusto Garuccio; Alwyn van der Merwe (6 December 2012). Waves and Particles in Light and Matter. Springer Science & Business Media. ISBN 978-1-4615-2550-9. (pbk reprint of 1994 original)
- Ferrero, M.; Merwe, Alwyn van der (6 December 2012). New Developments on Fundamental Problems in Quantum Physics. Springer. ISBN 9789401158862. (pbk reprint of 1997 original)
- Tarozzi, G.; Merwe, Alwyn van der (6 December 2012). Open Questions in Quantum Physics: Invited Papers on the Foundations of Microphysics. Springer. ISBN 9789400952454. (pbk reprint of 1985 original)
- Tarozzi, G.; Merwe, Alwyn van der (6 December 2012). The Nature of Quantum Paradoxes: Italian Studies in the Foundations and Philosophy of Modern Physics. Springer. ISBN 9789400929470. (pbk reprint of 1988 reprint)
- Esposito, Salvatore; Majorana, Ettore Jr.; Merwe, Alwyn van der; Recami, E. (9 March 2013). Ettore Majorana: Notes on Theoretical Physics. Springer. ISBN 9789401701075. (pbk reprint of 2003 original)
- Ferrero, M.; Merwe, Alwyn van der (29 June 2013). Fundamental Problems in Quantum Physics. Springer. ISBN 9789401585293.
- Merwe, Alwyn Van der; Zurek, Wojciech Hubert; Miller, Warner Allen (14 March 2017). Between Quantum and Cosmos: Studies and Essays in Honor of John Archibald Wheeler. Princeton University Press. ISBN 9781400886975. (pbk reprint of 1988 original)
