= Ning Li (physicist) =

American physicist (1943–2021)

- 李宁
- Born: January 14, 1943; Shandong
- Died: July 27, 2021 (aged 78); Huntsville
- Education: Peking University
- Known for: Anti-gravity research
- Scientific career
- Workplaces: University of Alabama in Huntsville

Ning Li (Chinese: 李宁; pinyin: Lǐ Níng; January 14, 1943 – July 27, 2021) was a Chinese-American physicist. She is known for her research into anti-gravity. In the 1990s, Li worked as a research scientist at the Center for Space Plasma and Aeronomic Research (CSPAR) at the University of Alabama in Huntsville. In 1999, she left the university to form a company, AC Gravity LLC, to continue anti-gravity research. Her work and the circumstances leading up to her death in 2021 have resulted in multiple conspiracy theories.

== Early life and education ==
Born in Shandong, she graduated from the Department of Physics of Peking University, and in 1983 she emigrated with her family from China to the United States.

== Anti-gravity research ==
In a series of papers co-authored with fellow university physicist Douglas Torr and published between 1991 and 1993, she claimed a practical way to produce anti-gravity effects. She claimed that an anti-gravity effect could be produced by rotating ions creating a gravitomagnetic field perpendicular to their spin axis. In her theory, if a large number of ions could be aligned (in a Bose–Einstein condensate), the resulting effect would be a very strong gravitomagnetic field producing a strong repulsive force. The alignment may be possible by trapping superconductor ions in a lattice structure in a high-temperature superconducting disc. Her claim of having functional anti-gravity devices was cited by the popular press and in popular science magazines with some enthusiasm at the time. Press reports at the time also noted potential applications in facilitating payload launches, as the pair sought funding from NASA and United States Army Aviation and Missile Command. In 1997, Li, Koczor and colleagues published a paper stating that recent experiments by Eugene Podkletnov reported anomalous weight changes of 0.05–2.1% for a test mass suspended above a rotating superconductor, but that their own experiments with a non-rotating superconductor failed to produce this gravitational effect.

While at the University of Alabama in 1990s, Li's work attracted the involvement and funding of NASA's Marshall Space Flight Center. However, Li was reported to have become frustrated at the pace of research at the center. The Huntsville Times also reported an "academic turf war" involving Li and colleagues at the time.

Li was reported to have left the University of Alabama in 1999 to found the company AC Gravity LLC. AC Gravity was awarded a United States Department of Defense grant for $448,970 in 2001 to continue anti-gravity research. The grant period ended in 2002 but no results from this research were ever made public. In 2003, she presented related findings at a MITRE conference titled “Measurability of AC Gravity Fields,” alongside a Redstone Arsenal official from U.S. Army Aviation and Missile Command. No evidence exists that the company performed any other work, although as of 2025, AC Gravity still remains listed as an extant business.

A 2023 article published by the Huntsville Business Journal cited an interview with Li's son, George Men. According to Men, Li continued anti-gravity research for the Department of Defense but she stopped publishing or discussing her research findings upon attaining a top secret security clearance. Men stated that Chinese government officials approached Li in 2008 regarding an offer to return to China to continue her research, which she rejected. Men further stated that US authorities did not permit Li to return to China to attend her mother's funeral.

== Death ==
In 2014, Ning Li was struck by a vehicle while crossing the street on the University of Alabama in Huntsville campus. Li's husband, seeing the accident, suffered a heart attack and died a year later in 2015. For Ning Li, this accident caused permanent brain damage. Li's son cared for her during the next six years while Li suffered from Alzheimer's disease. On July 27, 2021, Ning Li died at the age of 78. Attempts to gain more insight into her work through Freedom of Information Act (FOIA) requests were reportedly denied. Her work and circumstances prior to her death have resulted in multiple conspiracy theories.

== Select publications ==
- Li, Ning; Torr, Douglas G. (January 15, 1991). "Effects of a gravitomagnetic field on pure superconductors". Physical Review D. 43 (2): 457–459. Bibcode:1991PhRvD..43..457L. doi:10.1103/PhysRevD.43.457. PMID 10013404.
- Li, Ning; Torr, Douglas G. (September 1, 1992). "Gravitational effects on the magnetic attenuation of superconductors". Physical Review B. 46 (9): 5489–5495. Bibcode:1992PhRvB..46.5489L. doi:10.1103/PhysRevB.46.5489. PMID 10004334.
- Li, Ning; Torr, Douglas G. (August 1, 1993). "Gravito-electric coupling via superconductivity". Foundations of Physics Letters. 6 (4): 371–383. Bibcode:1993FoPhL...6..371T. doi:10.1007/BF00665654. S2CID 122075917.
- Li, Ning; Noever, David; Robertson, Tony; Koczor, Ron; Brantley, Whitt (August 1, 1997). "Static Test for a Gravitational Force Coupled to Type II YBCO Superconductors". Physica C. 281 (2–3): 260–267. Bibcode:1997PhyC..281..260L. doi:10.1016/S0921-4534(97)01462-7.

== See also ==
- Missing scientists conspiracy theory
