= BRST quantization =

Formulation to quantize gauge field theories in physics

In theoretical physics, the BRST formalism, or BRST quantization (where the BRST refers to the last names of Carlo Becchi, Alain Rouet, Raymond Stora and Igor Tyutin) denotes a relatively rigorous mathematical approach to quantizing a field theory with a gauge symmetry. Quantization rules in earlier quantum field theory (QFT) frameworks resembled "prescriptions" or "heuristics" more than proofs, especially in non-abelian QFT, where the use of "ghost fields" with superficially bizarre properties is almost unavoidable for technical reasons related to renormalization and anomaly cancellation.

The BRST global supersymmetry introduced in the mid-1970s was quickly understood to rationalize the introduction of these Faddeev–Popov ghosts and their exclusion from "physical" asymptotic states when performing QFT calculations. Crucially, this symmetry of the path integral is preserved in loop order, and thus prevents introduction of counterterms which might spoil renormalizability of gauge theories. Work by other authors a few years later related the BRST operator to the existence of a rigorous alternative to path integrals when quantizing a gauge theory.

Only in the late 1970s, when QFT was reformulated in fiber bundle language for application to problems in the topology of low-dimensional manifolds (topological quantum field theory), did it become apparent that the BRST "transformation" is fundamentally geometrical in character. In this light, "BRST quantization" becomes more than an alternate way to arrive at anomaly-cancelling ghosts. It is a different perspective on what the ghost fields represent, why the Faddeev–Popov method works, and how it is related to the use of Hamiltonian mechanics to construct a perturbative framework. The relationship between gauge invariance and "BRST invariance" forces the choice of a Hamiltonian system whose states are composed of "particles" according to the rules familiar from the canonical quantization formalism. This esoteric consistency condition therefore comes quite close to explaining how quanta and fermions arise in physics to begin with.

In certain cases, notably gravity and supergravity, BRST must be superseded by a more general formalism, the Batalin–Vilkovisky formalism.

== Technical summary ==
BRST quantization is a differential geometric approach to performing consistent, anomaly-free perturbative calculations in a non-abelian gauge theory. The analytical form of the BRST "transformation" and its relevance to renormalization and anomaly cancellation were described by Carlo Maria Becchi, Alain Rouet, and Raymond Stora in a series of papers culminating in the 1976 "Renormalization of gauge theories". The equivalent transformation and many of its properties were independently discovered by Igor Viktorovich Tyutin. Its significance for rigorous canonical quantization of a Yang–Mills theory and its correct application to the Fock space of instantaneous field configurations were elucidated by Taichiro Kugo and Izumi Ojima. Later work by many authors, notably Thomas Schücker and Edward Witten, has clarified the geometric significance of the BRST operator and related fields and emphasized its importance to topological quantum field theory and string theory.

In the BRST approach, one selects a perturbation-friendly gauge fixing procedure for the action principle of a gauge theory using the differential geometry of the gauge bundle on which the field theory lives. One then quantizes the theory to obtain a Hamiltonian system in the interaction picture in such a way that the "unphysical" fields introduced by the gauge fixing procedure resolve gauge anomalies without appearing in the asymptotic states of the theory. The result is a set of Feynman rules for use in a Dyson series perturbative expansion of the S-matrix which guarantee that it is unitary and renormalizable at each loop order—in short, a coherent approximation technique for making physical predictions about the results of scattering experiments.

=== Classical BRST ===
This is related to a supersymplectic manifold where pure operators are graded by integral ghost numbers and we have a BRST cohomology.

== Gauge transformations ==
From a practical perspective, a quantum field theory consists of an action principle and a set of procedures for performing perturbative calculations. There are other kinds of "sanity checks" that can be performed on a quantum field theory to determine whether it fits qualitative phenomena such as quark confinement and asymptotic freedom. However, most of the predictive successes of quantum field theory, from quantum electrodynamics to the present day, have been quantified by matching S-matrix calculations against the results of scattering experiments.

In the early days of QFT, one would have had to say that the quantization and renormalization prescriptions were as much part of the model as the Lagrangian density, especially when they relied on the powerful but mathematically ill-defined path integral formalism. It quickly became clear that QED was almost "magical" in its relative tractability, and that most of the ways that one might imagine extending it would not produce rational calculations. However, one class of field theories remained promising: gauge theories, in which the objects in the theory represent equivalence classes of physically indistinguishable field configurations, any two of which are related by a gauge transformation. This generalizes the QED idea of a local change of phase to a more complicated Lie group.

QED itself is a gauge theory, as is general relativity, although the latter has proven resistant to quantization so far, for reasons related to renormalization. Another class of gauge theories with a non-Abelian gauge group, beginning with Yang–Mills theory, became amenable to quantization in the late 1960s and early 1970s, largely due to the work of Ludwig D. Faddeev, Victor Popov, Bryce DeWitt, and Gerardus 't Hooft. However, they remained very difficult to work with until the introduction of the BRST method. The BRST method provided the calculation techniques and renormalizability proofs needed to extract accurate results from both "unbroken" Yang–Mills theories and those in which the Higgs mechanism leads to spontaneous symmetry breaking. Representatives of these two types of Yang–Mills systems—quantum chromodynamics and electroweak theory—appear in the Standard Model of particle physics.

It has proven rather more difficult to prove the existence of non-Abelian quantum field theory in a rigorous sense than to obtain accurate predictions using semi-heuristic calculation schemes. This is because analyzing a quantum field theory requires two mathematically interlocked perspectives: a Lagrangian system based on the action functional, composed of fields with distinct values at each point in spacetime and local operators which act on them, and a Hamiltonian system in the Dirac picture, composed of states which characterize the entire system at a given time and field operators which act on them. What makes this so difficult in a gauge theory is that the objects of the theory are not really local fields on spacetime; they are right-invariant local fields on the principal gauge bundle, and different local sections through a portion of the gauge bundle, related by passive transformations, produce different Dirac pictures.

What is more, a description of the system as a whole in terms of a set of fields contains many redundant degrees of freedom; the distinct configurations of the theory are equivalence classes of field configurations, so that two descriptions which are related to one another by a gauge transformation are also really the same physical configuration. The "solutions" of a quantized gauge theory exist not in a straightforward space of fields with values at every point in spacetime but in a quotient space (or cohomology) whose elements are equivalence classes of field configurations. Hiding in the BRST formalism is a system for parameterizing the variations associated with all possible active gauge transformations and correctly accounting for their physical irrelevance during the conversion of a Lagrangian system to a Hamiltonian system.

=== Gauge fixing and perturbation theory ===
The principle of gauge invariance is essential to constructing a workable quantum field theory. But it is generally not feasible to perform a perturbative calculation in a gauge theory without first "fixing the gauge"—adding terms to the Lagrangian density of the action principle which "break the gauge symmetry" to suppress these "unphysical" degrees of freedom. The idea of gauge fixing goes back to the Lorenz gauge approach to electromagnetism, which suppresses most of the excess degrees of freedom in the four-potential while retaining manifest Lorentz invariance. The Lorenz gauge is a great simplification relative to Maxwell's field-strength approach to classical electrodynamics, and illustrates why it is useful to deal with excess degrees of freedom in the representation of the objects in a theory at the Lagrangian stage, before passing over to Hamiltonian mechanics via the Legendre transformation.

The Hamiltonian density is related to the Lie derivative of the Lagrangian density with respect to a unit timelike horizontal vector field on the gauge bundle. In a quantum mechanical context it is conventionally rescaled by a factor $i \hbar$. Integrating it by parts over a spacelike cross section recovers the form of the integrand familiar from canonical quantization. Because the definition of the Hamiltonian involves a unit time vector field on the base space, a horizontal lift to the bundle space, and a spacelike surface "normal" (in the Minkowski metric) to the unit time vector field at each point on the base manifold, it is dependent both on the connection and the choice of Lorentz frame, and is far from being globally defined. But it is an essential ingredient in the perturbative framework of quantum field theory, into which the quantized Hamiltonian enters via the Dyson series.

For perturbative purposes, we gather the configuration of all the fields of our theory on an entire three-dimensional horizontal spacelike cross section of P into one object (a Fock state), and then describe the "evolution" of this state over time using the interaction picture. The Fock space is spanned by the multi-particle eigenstates of the "unperturbed" or "non-interaction" portion $\mathcal{H}_0$ of the Hamiltonian $\mathcal{H}$. Hence the instantaneous description of any Fock state is a complex-amplitude-weighted sum of eigenstates of $\mathcal{H}_0$. In the interaction picture, we relate Fock states at different times by prescribing that each eigenstate of the unperturbed Hamiltonian experiences a constant rate of phase rotation proportional to its energy (the corresponding eigenvalue of the unperturbed Hamiltonian).

Hence, in the zero-order approximation, the set of weights characterizing a Fock state does not change over time, but the corresponding field configuration does. In higher approximations, the weights also change; collider experiments in high-energy physics amount to measurements of the rate of change in these weights (or rather integrals of them over distributions representing uncertainty in the initial and final conditions of a scattering event). The Dyson series captures the effect of the discrepancy between $\mathcal{H}_0$ and the true Hamiltonian $\mathcal{H}$, in the form of a power series in the coupling constant g; it is the principal tool for making quantitative predictions from a quantum field theory.

To use the Dyson series to calculate anything, one needs more than a gauge-invariant Lagrangian density; one also needs the quantization and gauge fixing prescriptions that enter into the Feynman rules of the theory. The Dyson series produces infinite integrals of various kinds when applied to the Hamiltonian of a particular QFT. This is partly because all usable quantum field theories to date must be considered effective field theories, describing only interactions on a certain range of energy scales that we can experimentally probe and therefore vulnerable to ultraviolet divergences. These are tolerable as long as they can be handled via standard techniques of renormalization; they are not so tolerable when they result in an infinite series of infinite renormalizations or, worse, in an obviously unphysical prediction such as an uncancelled gauge anomaly. There is a deep relationship between renormalizability and gauge invariance, which is easily lost in the course of attempts to obtain tractable Feynman rules by fixing the gauge.

=== Pre-BRST approaches to gauge fixing ===
The traditional gauge fixing prescriptions of continuum electrodynamics select a unique representative from each gauge-transformation-related equivalence class using a constraint equation such as the Lorenz gauge $\partial^\mu A_\mu = 0$. This sort of prescription can be applied to an Abelian gauge theory such as QED, although it results in some difficulty in explaining why the Ward identities of the classical theory carry over to the quantum theory—in other words, why Feynman diagrams containing internal longitudinally polarized virtual photons do not contribute to S-matrix calculations. This approach also does not generalize well to non-Abelian gauge groups such as the SU(2)xU(1) of Yang–Mills electroweak theory and the SU(3) of quantum chromodynamics. It suffers from Gribov ambiguities and from the difficulty of defining a gauge fixing constraint that is in some sense "orthogonal" to physically significant changes in the field configuration.

More sophisticated approaches do not attempt to apply a delta function constraint to the gauge transformation degrees of freedom. Instead of "fixing" the gauge to a particular "constraint surface" in configuration space, one can break the gauge freedom with an additional, non-gauge-invariant term added to the Lagrangian density. In order to reproduce the successes of gauge fixing, this term is chosen to be minimal for the choice of gauge that corresponds to the desired constraint and to depend quadratically on the deviation of the gauge from the constraint surface. By the stationary phase approximation on which the Feynman path integral is based, the dominant contribution to perturbative calculations will come from field configurations in the neighborhood of the constraint surface.

The perturbative expansion associated with this Lagrangian, using the method of functional quantization, is generally referred to as the R_{ξ} gauge. It reduces in the case of an Abelian U(1) gauge to the same set of Feynman rules that one obtains in the method of canonical quantization. But there is an important difference: the broken gauge freedom appears in the functional integral as an additional factor in the overall normalization. This factor can only be pulled out of the perturbative expansion (and ignored) when the contribution to the Lagrangian of a perturbation along the gauge degrees of freedom is independent of the particular "physical" field configuration. This is the condition that fails to hold for non-Abelian gauge groups. If one ignores the problem and attempts to use the Feynman rules obtained from "naive" functional quantization, one finds that one's calculations contain unremovable anomalies.

The problem of perturbative calculations in QCD was solved by introducing additional fields known as Faddeev–Popov ghosts, whose contribution to the gauge-fixed Lagrangian offsets the anomaly introduced by the coupling of "physical" and "unphysical" perturbations of the non-Abelian gauge field. From the functional quantization perspective, the "unphysical" perturbations of the field configuration (the gauge transformations) form a subspace of the space of all (infinitesimal) perturbations; in the non-Abelian case, the embedding of this subspace in the larger space depends on the configuration around which the perturbation takes place. The ghost term in the Lagrangian represents the functional determinant of the Jacobian of this embedding, and the properties of the ghost field are dictated by the exponent desired on the determinant in order to correct the functional measure on the remaining "physical" perturbation axes.

== Gauge bundles and the vertical ideal ==
Intuition for the BRST formalism is provided by describing it geometrically, in the setting of fiber bundles. This geometric setting contrasts with and illuminates the older traditional picture, that of algebra-valued fields on Minkowski space, provided in (earlier) quantum field theory texts.

In this setting, a gauge field can be understood in one of two different ways. In one, the gauge field is a local section of the fiber bundle. In the other, the gauge field is little more than the connection between adjacent fibers, defined on the entire length of the fiber. Corresponding to these two understandings, there are two ways to look at a gauge transformation. In the first case, a gauge transformation is just a change of local section. In general relativity, this is referred to as a passive transformation. In the second view, a gauge transformation is a change of coordinates along the entire fiber (arising from multiplication by a group element g) which induces a vertical diffeomorphism of the principal bundle.

This second viewpoint provides the geometric foundation for the BRST method. Unlike a passive transformation, it is well-defined globally on a principal bundle, with any structure group over an arbitrary manifold. That is, the BRST formalism can be developed to describe the quantization of any principle bundle on any manifold. For concreteness and relevance to conventional QFT, much of this article sticks to the case of a principal gauge bundle with compact fiber over 4-dimensional Minkowski space.

A principal gauge bundle P over a 4-manifold M is locally isomorphic to U × F, where U ⊂ R^{4} and the fiber F is isomorphic to a Lie group G, the gauge group of the field theory (this is an isomorphism of manifold structures, not of group structures; there is no special surface in P corresponding to 1 in G, so it is more proper to say that the fiber F is a G-torsor). The most basic property as a fiber bundle is the "projection to the base space" π : P → M, which defines the vertical directions on P (those lying within the fiber π^{−1}(p) over each point p in M). As a gauge bundle it has a left action of G on P which respects the fiber structure, and as a principal bundle it also has a right action of G on P which also respects the fiber structure and commutes with the left action.

The left action of the structure group G on P corresponds to a change of coordinate system on an individual fiber. The (global) right action R_{g} : P → P for a fixed g in G corresponds to an actual automorphism of each fiber and hence to a map of P to itself. In order for P to qualify as a principal G-bundle, the global right action of each g in G must be an automorphism with respect to the manifold structure of P with a smooth dependence on g, that is, a diffeomorphism P × G → P.

The existence of the global right action of the structure group picks out a special class of right invariant geometric objects on P—those which do not change when they are pulled back along R_{g} for all values of g in G. The most important right invariant objects on a principal bundle are the right invariant vector fields, which form an ideal $\mathfrak{E}$ of the Lie algebra of infinitesimal diffeomorphisms on P. Those vector fields on P which are both right invariant and vertical form an ideal $V\mathfrak{E}$ of $\mathfrak{E}$, which has a relationship to the entire bundle P analogous to that of the Lie algebra $\mathfrak{g}$ of the gauge group G to the individual G-torsor fiber F.

The "field theory" of interest is defined in terms of a set of "fields" (smooth maps into various vector spaces) defined on a principal gauge bundle P. Different fields carry different representations of the gauge group G, and perhaps of other symmetry groups of the manifold such as the Poincaré group. One may define the space $Pl$ of local polynomials in these fields and their derivatives. The fundamental Lagrangian density of one's theory is presumed to lie in the subspace $Pl_0$ of polynomials which are real-valued and invariant under any unbroken non-gauge symmetry groups. It is also presumed to be invariant not only under the left action (passive coordinate transformations) and the global right action of the gauge group but also under local gauge transformations—pullback along the infinitesimal diffeomorphism associated with an arbitrary choice of right-invariant vertical vector field $\epsilon \in V\mathfrak{E}$.

Identifying local gauge transformations with a particular subspace of vector fields on the manifold P provides a better framework for dealing with infinite-dimensional infinitesimals: differential geometry and the exterior calculus. The change in a scalar field under pullback along an infinitesimal automorphism is captured in the Lie derivative, and the notion of retaining only the term linear in the vector field is implemented by separating it into the interior derivative and the exterior derivative. In this context, "forms" and the exterior calculus refer exclusively to degrees of freedom which are dual to vector fields on the gauge bundle, not to degrees of freedom expressed in (Greek) tensor indices on the base manifold or (Roman) matrix indices on the gauge algebra.

The Lie derivative on a manifold is a globally well-defined operation in a way that the partial derivative is not. The proper generalization of Clairaut's theorem to the non-trivial manifold structure of P is given by the Lie bracket of vector fields and the nilpotence of the exterior derivative. This provides an essential tool for computation: the generalized Stokes theorem, which allows integration by parts and then elimination of the surface term, as long as the integrand drops off rapidly enough in directions where there is an open boundary. (This is not a trivial assumption, but can be dealt with by renormalization techniques such as dimensional regularization as long as the surface term can be made gauge invariant.)

== BRST operator and asymptotic Fock space ==
Central to the BRST formalism is the BRST operator $s_B$, defined as the tangent to the Ward operator $W(\delta\lambda)$. The Ward operator on each field may be identified (up to a sign convention) with the Lie derivative along the vertical vector field associated with the local gauge transformation $\delta\lambda$ appearing as a parameter of the Ward operator. The BRST operator $s_B$ on fields resembles the exterior derivative on the gauge bundle, or rather to its restriction to a reduced space of alternating forms which are defined only on vertical vector fields. The Ward and BRST operators are related (up to a phase convention introduced by Kugo and Ojima, whose notation we will follow in the treatment of state vectors below) by $W(\delta\lambda) X = \delta\lambda\; s_B X$. Here, $X \in {Pl}_0$ is a zero-form (scalar). The space ${Pl}_0$ is the space of real-valued polynomials in the fields and their derivatives that are invariant under any (unbroken) non-gauge symmetry groups.

Like the exterior derivative, the BRST operator is nilpotent of degree 2, i. e., $(s_B)^2 = 0$. The variation of any "BRST-exact form" $s_B X$ with respect to a local gauge transformation $\delta\lambda$ is given by the interior derivative $\iota_{\delta\lambda}.$ It is

$$\begin{align}
\left [\iota_{\delta\lambda}, s_B \right ] s_B X &= \iota_{\delta\lambda} (s_B s_B X) + s_B \left  (\iota_{\delta\lambda} (s_B X) \right ) \\
&= s_B \left (\iota_{\delta\lambda} (s_B X) \right )
\end{align}$$

Note that this is also exact.

The Hamiltonian perturbative formalism is carried out not on the fiber bundle, but on a local section. In this formalism, adding a BRST-exact term to a gauge invariant Lagrangian density preserves the relation $s_BX=0.$ This implies that there is a related operator $Q_B$ on the state space for which $[Q_B, \mathcal{H}] = 0.$ That is, the BRST operator on Fock states is a conserved charge of the Hamiltonian system. This implies that the time evolution operator in a Dyson series calculation will not evolve a field configuration obeying $Q_B |\Psi_i\rangle = 0$ into a later configuration with $Q_B |\Psi_f\rangle \neq 0$ (or vice versa).

The nilpotence of the BRST operator can be understood as saying that its image (the space of BRST exact forms) lies entirely within its kernel (the space of BRST closed forms). The "true" Lagrangian, presumed to be invariant under local gauge transformations, is in the kernel of the BRST operator but not in its image. This implies that the universe of initial and final conditions can be limited to asymptotic "states" or field configurations at timelike infinity, where the interaction Lagrangian is "turned off". These states lie in the kernel of $Q_B,$ but as the construction is invariant, the scattering matrix remains unitary. BRST-closed and exact states are defined similarly to BRST-closed and exact fields; closed states are annihilated by $Q_B,$ while exact states are those obtainable by applying $Q_B$ to some arbitrary field configuration.

When defining the asymptotic states, the states that lie inside the image of $Q_B$ can also be suppressed, but the reasoning is a bit subtler. Having postulated that the "true" Lagrangian of the theory is gauge invariant, the true "states" of the Hamiltonian system are equivalence classes under local gauge transformation; in other words, two initial or final states in the Hamiltonian picture that differ only by a BRST-exact state are physically equivalent. However, the use of a BRST-exact gauge breaking prescription does not guarantee that the interaction Hamiltonian will preserve any particular subspace of closed field configurations that are orthogonal to the space of exact configurations. This is a crucial point, often mishandled in QFT textbooks. There is no a priori inner product on field configurations built into the action principle; such an inner product is constructed as part of the Hamiltonian perturbative apparatus.

The quantization prescription in the interaction picture is to build a vector space of BRST-closed configurations at a particular time, such that this can be converted into a Fock space of intermediate states suitable for Hamiltonian perturbation. As is conventional for second quantization, the Fock space is provided with ladder operators for the energy-momentum eigenconfigurations (particles) of each field, complete with appropriate (anti-)commutation rules, as well as a positive semi-definite inner product. The inner product is required to be singular exclusively along directions that correspond to BRST-exact eigenstates of the unperturbed Hamiltonian. This ensures that any pair of BRST-closed Fock states can be freely chosen out of the two equivalence classes of asymptotic field configurations corresponding to particular initial and final eigenstates of the (unbroken) free-field Hamiltonian.

The desired quantization prescriptions provide a quotient Fock space isomorphic to the BRST cohomology, in which each BRST-closed equivalence class of intermediate states (differing only by an exact state) is represented by exactly one state that contains no quanta of the BRST-exact fields. This is the appropriate Fock space for the asymptotic states of the theory. The singularity of the inner product along BRST-exact degrees of freedom ensures that the physical scattering matrix contains only physical fields. This is in contrast to the (naive, gauge-fixed) Lagrangian dynamics, in which unphysical particles are propagated to the asymptotic states. By working in the cohomology, each asymptotic state is guaranteed to have one (and only one) corresponding physical state (free of ghosts).

The operator $Q_B$ is Hermitian and non-zero, yet its square is zero. This implies that the Fock space of all states prior to the cohomological reduction has an indefinite norm, and so is not a Hilbert space. This requires that a Krein space for the BRST-closed intermediate Fock states, with the time reversal operator playing the role of the "fundamental symmetry" relating the Lorentz-invariant and positive semi-definite inner products. The asymptotic state space is then the Hilbert space obtained by quotienting BRST-exact states out of the Krein space.

To summarize: no field introduced as part of a BRST gauge fixing procedure will appear in asymptotic states of the gauge-fixed theory. However, this does not imply that these "unphysical" fields are absent in the intermediate states of a perturbative calculation! This is because perturbative calculations are done in the interaction picture. They implicitly involve initial and final states of the non-interaction Hamiltonian $\mathcal{H}_0$, gradually transformed into states of the full Hamiltonian in accordance with the adiabatic theorem by "turning on" the interaction Hamiltonian (the gauge coupling). The expansion of the Dyson series in terms of Feynman diagrams will include vertices that couple "physical" particles (those that can appear in asymptotic states of the free Hamiltonian) to "unphysical" particles (states of fields that live outside the kernel of $s_B$ or inside the image of $s_B$) and vertices that couple "unphysical" particles to one another.

=== Ghost Decoupling and the Kugo-Ojima Quartet Mechanism ===
In the BRST quantization of a gauge theory, ghost decoupling is the fundamental mechanism by which the unphysical degrees of freedom—namely the timelike and longitudinal polarizations of the gauge field and the ghost fields themselves—are guaranteed to have no effect on physical observables. This ensures the unitarity of the S-matrix. The mechanism is a direct consequence of the nilpotent BRST symmetry and is most clearly understood through the Kugo-Ojima quartet mechanism.

The full state space $\mathcal{V}$ of the theory is larger than the physical Hilbert space $\mathcal{H}_{phys}$ and contains states with negative norm, which would violate probability conservation if they appeared as external states in physical processes. The BRST charge $Q$ organizes this larger space. Physical states $|phys\rangle$ are defined as those that are annihilated by the BRST charge, i.e., they belong to the kernel of $Q$ ($Q|phys\rangle = 0$). However, this space still contains zero-norm states known as "null states," which are states that can be written as $|\psi\rangle = Q|\chi\rangle$ for some state $|\chi\rangle$ (i.e., they belong to the image of $Q$). The physical Hilbert space is formally the cohomology of $Q$: $\mathcal{H}_{phys} = \ker(Q) / \text{im}(Q)$.

The quartet mechanism reveals how this formal definition leads to a practical cancellation. For any given momentum, the unphysical states form a "quartet" of parent and daughter states linked by the action of the BRST charge. For instance, in QED in the Lorenz gauge, this quartet consists of:

- The longitudinal photon polarization state, $|\epsilon_L\rangle$.
- The timelike (or scalar) photon polarization state, $|\epsilon_S\rangle$.
- The ghost state, $|c\rangle$.
- The antighost state, $|b\rangle$.

These states are mapped into each other by $Q$ in a way that ensures they form a representation of the symmetry that is trivial in the cohomology. For example, $Q$ maps the antighost state to the scalar photon state, and the longitudinal photon state to the ghost state (up to constants). The crucial point is that none of these four states are in the physical Hilbert space. The two unphysical photon polarizations are not in $\ker(Q)$, while the ghost and antighost states, while being in $\ker(Q)$, are also in $\text{im}(Q)$ and are therefore null states treated as equivalent to zero.

This structure guarantees that whenever an unphysical mode is produced in an intermediate state of a Feynman diagram, its contribution is perfectly canceled by another. For every unphysical excitation of the gauge field, there’s a matching ghost excitation that cancels it out in the physical subspace. This is because the Faddeev-Popov ghosts, being fermions, introduce a minus sign in loops and propagators that is precisely what is needed to subtract the contributions from the unphysical polarizations. Ghost decoupling means that BRST symmetry enforces a pairing between unphysical gauge and ghost modes, so their effects cancel in any gauge-invariant observable — leaving only the physical (transverse) degrees of freedom.

== Kugo–Ojima answer to unitarity questions ==
T. Kugo and I. Ojima are commonly credited with the discovery of the principal QCD color confinement criterion. Their role in obtaining a correct version of the BRST formalism in the Lagrangian framework seems to be less widely appreciated. It is enlightening to inspect their variant of the BRST transformation, which emphasizes the hermitian properties of the newly introduced fields, before proceeding from an entirely geometrical angle.

The $\mathfrak{g}$-valued gauge fixing conditions are taken to be $G=\xi\partial^\mu A_\mu,$ where $\xi$ is a positive number determining the gauge. There are other possible gauge fixings, but are outside of the present scope. The fields appearing in the Lagrangian are:

- The QCD color field, that is, the $\mathfrak{g}$-valued connection form $A_\mu.$
- The Faddeev–Popov ghost $c^i$, which is a $\mathfrak{g}$-valued scalar field with fermionic statistics.
- The antighost $b_i=\bar{c}_i$, also a $\mathfrak{g}$-valued scalar field with fermionic statistics.
- The auxiliary field $B_i$ which is a $\mathfrak{g}$-valued scalar field with bosonic statistics.

The field $c$ is used to deal with the gauge transformations, wheareas $b$ and $B$ deal with the gauge fixings. There actually are some subtleties associated with the gauge fixing due to Gribov ambiguities but they will not be covered here.

The BRST Lagrangian density is

$$\mathcal{L} = \mathcal{L}_\textrm{matter}(\psi,\,A_\mu^a) -{1\over 4g^2} \operatorname{Tr}[F^{\mu\nu}F_{\mu\nu}]+{1\over 2g^2} \operatorname{Tr}[BB]-{1\over g^2} \operatorname{Tr}[BG]-{\xi\over g^2} \operatorname{Tr}[\partial^\mu b D_\mu c]$$

Here, $D_\mu$ is the covariant derivative with respect to the gauge field (connection) $A_\mu.$ The Faddeev–Popov ghost field $c$ has a geometrical interpretation as a version of the Maurer–Cartan form on $V\mathfrak{E}$, which relates each right-invariant vertical vector field $\delta\lambda \in V\mathfrak{E}$ to its representation (up to a phase) as a $\mathfrak{g}$-valued field. This field must enter into the formulas for infinitesimal gauge transformations on objects (such as fermions $\psi$, gauge bosons $A_\mu$, and the ghost $c$ itself) which carry a non-trivial representation of the gauge group.

While the Lagrangian density isn't BRST invariant, its integral over all of spacetime, the action is. The transformation of the fields under an infinitesimal gauge transformation $\delta\lambda$ is given by

$$\begin{align}
\delta \psi_i &= \delta\lambda D_i c \\
\delta A_\mu &= \delta\lambda D_\mu c \\
\delta c &= \delta\lambda \tfrac{i}{2} [c, c] \\
\delta b= \delta\bar{c} &= \delta\lambda B \\
\delta B &= 0
\end{align}$$

Note that $[\cdot,\cdot]$ is the Lie bracket, NOT the commutator. These may be written in an equivalent form, using the charge operator $Q_B$ instead of $\delta\lambda$. The BRST charge operator $Q_B$ is defined as

$$Q_B = c^i \left(L_i-\frac 12 {{f_{i}}^j}_k b_j c^k\right)$$

where $L_i$ are the infinitesimal generators of the Lie group, and $f_{ij}{}^k$ are its structure constants. Using this, the transformation is given as

$$\begin{align}
Q_B A_\mu &= D_\mu c \\
Q_B c &= {i\over 2}[c,c] \\
Q_B b &= B \\
Q_B B &= 0
\end{align}$$

The details of the matter sector $\psi$ are unspecified, as is left the form of the Ward operator on it; these are unimportant so long as the representation of the gauge algebra on the matter fields is consistent with their coupling to $\delta A_\mu$. The properties of the other fields are fundamentally analytical rather than geometric. The bias is towards connections with $\partial^\mu A_\mu = 0$ is gauge-dependent and has no particular geometrical significance. The anti-ghost $b=\bar{c}$ is nothing but a Lagrange multiplier for the gauge fixing term, and the properties of the scalar field $B$ are entirely dictated by the relationship $\delta \bar{c} = i \delta\lambda B$. These fields are all Hermitian in Kugo–Ojima conventions, but the parameter $\delta\lambda$ is an anti-Hermitian "anti-commuting c-number". This results in some unnecessary awkwardness with regard to phases and passing infinitesimal parameters through operators; this can be resolved with a change of conventions.

We already know, from the relation of the BRST operator to the exterior derivative and the Faddeev–Popov ghost to the Maurer–Cartan form, that the ghost $c$ corresponds (up to a phase) to a $\mathfrak{g}$-valued 1-form on $V\mathfrak{E}$. In order for integration of a term like $-i (\partial^\mu \bar{c}) D_\mu c$ to be meaningful, the anti-ghost $\bar{c}$ must carry representations of these two Lie algebras—the vertical ideal $V\mathfrak{E}$ and the gauge algebra $\mathfrak{g}$—dual to those carried by the ghost. In geometric terms, $\bar{c}$ must be fiberwise dual to $\mathfrak{g}$ and one rank short of being a top form on $V\mathfrak{E}$. Likewise, the auxiliary field $B$ must carry the same representation of $\mathfrak{g}$ (up to a phase) as $\bar{c}$, as well as the representation of $V\mathfrak{E}$ dual to its trivial representation on $A_\mu .$ That is, $B$ is a fiberwise $\mathfrak{g}$-dual top form on $V\mathfrak{E}$.

The one-particle states of the theory are discussed in the adiabatically decoupled limit g → 0. There are two kinds of quanta in the Fock space of the gauge-fixed Hamiltonian that lie entirely outside the kernel of the BRST operator: those of the Faddeev–Popov anti-ghost $\bar{c}$ and the forward polarized gauge boson. This is because no combination of fields containing $\bar{c}$ is annihilated by $s_B$ and the Lagrangian has a gauge breaking term that is equal, up to a divergence, to

$$s_B \left (\bar{c} \left (i \partial^\mu A_\mu - \tfrac{1}{2} \xi s_B \bar{c} \right ) \right ).$$

Likewise, there are two kinds of quanta that will lie entirely in the image of the BRST operator: those of the Faddeev–Popov ghost $c$ and the scalar field $B$, which is "eaten" by completing the square in the functional integral to become the backward polarized gauge boson. These are the four types of "unphysical" quanta which do not appear in the asymptotic states of a perturbative calculation.

The anti-ghost is taken to be a Lorentz scalar for the sake of Poincaré invariance in $-i (\partial^\mu \bar{c}) D_\mu c$. However, its (anti-)commutation law relative to $c$ i.e. its quantization prescription, which ignores the spin–statistics theorem by giving Fermi–Dirac statistics to a spin-0 particle—will be given by the requirement that the inner product on our Fock space of asymptotic states be singular along directions corresponding to the raising and lowering operators of some combination of non-BRST-closed and BRST-exact fields. This last statement is the key to "BRST quantization", as opposed to mere "BRST symmetry" or "BRST transformation".

(Needs to be completed in the language of BRST cohomology, with reference to the Kugo–Ojima treatment of asymptotic Fock space.)

== Gauge fixing in BRST quantization ==
While the BRST symmetry, with its corresponding charge Q, elegantly captures the essence of gauge invariance, it presents a challenge for path integral quantization. The naive path integral, summing over all gauge configurations, vastly overcounts physically distinct states due to the redundancy introduced by gauge transformations. This overcounting manifests as a divergence in the path integral arising from integrating over the gauge orbits. To address this, we introduce a gauge-fixing procedure within the BRST framework.

The core idea is to restrict the path integral to a representative set of gauge configurations, eliminating the redundant gauge degrees of freedom. This is achieved by introducing a gauge-fixing function, denoted f(A), where A represents the gauge field. The specific choice of f(A) determines the gauge. Different choices lead to different representations of the same physical theory, though the final physical results must be independent of this choice.

The gauge-fixing procedure within BRST quantization is implemented by adding a term to the Lagrangian density that depends on both the gauge-fixing function and the ghost fields. This term is constructed to be BRST-exact, meaning it can be written as the BRST variation of some quantity. This ensures that the modified action still possesses BRST symmetry.

A general form for the gauge-fixing Lagrangian density is:

$L_{gf} = -i Q(f(A) * \bar{c})$

where $\bar{c}$ is the antighost field. The factor of -i is a convention. Since Q² = 0, the BRST variation of L_{gf} is zero, preserving the BRST invariance of the total action.

Let's illustrate this with two common examples:

1. Gupta-Bleuler (Lorenz) Gauge in Electromagnetism:

In this gauge, the gauge-fixing function is $f(A) = \partial_\mu A^\mu$. The gauge-fixing Lagrangian density becomes:

$L_{gf} = -i Q( (\partial_\mu A^\mu) * \bar{c}) = -i ( (\partial_\mu \partial^\mu c) * \bar{c} - (\partial_\mu A^\mu) * B )$

where B is an auxiliary Nakanishi-Lautrup field introduced to rewrite the gauge condition. After integrating out B in the path integral, we obtain the familiar form:

$L_{gf} = -\frac{1}{2\xi} (\partial_\mu A^\mu)^2 + (\partial _\mu \bar{c})(\partial^\mu c)$

where ξ is a gauge parameter. The Lorenz gauge corresponds to the Feynman gauge (ξ = 1). Note that the ghost fields remain coupled to the gauge field through the BRST variation.

2. ξ-Gauges in Yang-Mills Theories:

For non-Abelian gauge theories, a generalized class of ξ-gauges can be defined with the gauge-fixing function $f(A) = \partial_\mu A^{\mu a} + \xi B^a$, where a is the gauge group index. The gauge-fixing Lagrangian density then becomes:

$L_{gf} = -i Q( (\partial_\mu A^{\mu a} + \xi B^a) * \bar{c}^a ) = B^a(\partial_\mu A^{\mu a}) + (\xi/2)B^a B^a + \bar{c}^a(\partial _\mu D^\mu c)^a$

where D^{μ} is the covariant derivative. The auxiliary field B^{a} can be integrated out, resulting in:

$L_{gf} = -\frac{1}{2\xi} (\partial _\mu A^{\mu a})^2 + \bar{c}^a(\partial_\mu D^\mu c)^a$

Again, ξ is a gauge parameter, and different choices of ξ correspond to different gauges within this family.

The introduction of the gauge-fixing term L_{gf} modifies the action and consequently the path integral. Crucially, the BRST symmetry is preserved, ensuring that physical observables remain independent of the gauge choice. Furthermore, the gauge-fixing procedure breaks the original gauge symmetry of the classical action, making the path integral well-defined. The ghost fields, originally introduced to compensate for the unphysical degrees of freedom, now play a crucial role in maintaining the unitarity of the theory in the quantized version.

== Mathematical approach ==
This section only applies to classical gauge theories. i.e. those that can be described with first class constraints. The more general formalism is described using the Batalin–Vilkovisky formalism.

The BRST construction applies to a situation of a Hamiltonian action of a gauge group $G$ on a phase space $M$. Let ${\mathfrak g}$ be the Lie algebra of $G$ and $0\in {\mathfrak g}^*$ a regular value of the moment map $\Phi: M\to {\mathfrak g}^*$. Let $M_0=\Phi^{-1}(0)$. Assume the $G$-action on $M_0$ is free and proper, and consider the space $\tilde M$ of $G$-orbits on $M_0$.

The Hamiltonian mechanics of a gauge theory is described by $r$ first class constraints $\Phi_i$ acting upon a symplectic space $M$. $M_0$ is the submanifold satisfying the first class constraints. The action of the gauge symmetry partitions $M_0$ into gauge orbits. The symplectic reduction is the quotient of $M_0$ by the gauge orbits.

According to algebraic geometry, the set of smooth functions over a space is a ring. The Koszul-Tate complex (the first class constraints aren't regular in general) describes the algebra associated with the symplectic reduction in terms of the algebra $C^\infty(M)$.

First, using equations defining $M_0$ inside $M$, construct a Koszul complex

$$... \to K^1(\Phi) \to C^{\infty}(M) \to 0$$

so that $H^0(K(\Phi))=C^\infty(M_0)$ and $H^p(K(\Phi))=0$ for $p\ne 0$.

Then, for the fibration $M_0 \to \tilde M$ one considers the complex of vertical exterior forms $(\Omega^\cdot_{vert}(M_0), d_{vert})$. Locally, $\Omega^\cdot_{vert}(M_0)$ is isomorphic to $\Lambda^\cdot V^* \otimes C^{\infty}(\tilde M)$, where $\Lambda^\cdot V^*$ is the exterior algebra of the dual of a vector space $V$. Using the Koszul resolution defined earlier, one obtains a bigraded complex

$$K^{i,j} = \Lambda^i V^* \otimes \Lambda^j V \otimes C^{\infty}(M).$$

Finally (and this is the most nontrivial step), a differential $s_B$ is defined on $K=\oplus_{i,j} K^{i,j}$ which lifts $d_{vert}$ to $K$ and such that $(s_B)^2 = 0$ and

$$H^0_{s_B} = C^{\infty}(\tilde M)$$

with respect to the grading by the ghost number : $K^n = \oplus_{i-j=n} K^{i,j}$.

Thus, the BRST operator or BRST differential $s_B$ accomplishes on the level of functions what symplectic reduction does on the level of manifolds.

There are two antiderivations, $\delta$ and $d$ which anticommute with each other. The BRST antiderivation $s_B$ is given by $\delta + d + \mathrm{more}$. The operator $s_B$ is nilpotent; $s^2=(\delta+d)^2=\delta^2 + d^2 + (\delta d + d\delta) = 0$

Consider the supercommutative algebra generated by $C^\infty(M)$ and Grassmann odd generators $\mathcal{P}_i$, i.e. the tensor product of a Grassmann algebra and $C^\infty(M)$. There is a unique antiderivation $\delta$ satisfying $\delta \mathcal{P}_i = -\Phi_i$ and $\delta f=0$ for all $f\in C^\infty(M)$. The zeroth homology is given by $C^\infty(M_0)$.

A longitudinal vector field on $M_0$ is a vector field over $M_0$ which is tangent everywhere to the gauge orbits. The Lie bracket of two longitudinal vector fields is itself another longitudinal vector field. Longitudinal $p$-forms are dual to the exterior algebra of $p$-vectors. $d$ is essentially the longitudinal exterior derivative defined by

$$\begin{align}
d\omega(V_0, \ldots, V_k) = & \sum_i(-1)^{i} d_{{}_{V_i}} ( \omega  (V_0, \ldots, \widehat V_i, \ldots,V_k ))\\
& + \sum_{i<j}(-1)^{i+j}\omega  ([V_i, V_j], V_0, \ldots, \widehat V_i, \ldots, \widehat V_j, \ldots, V_k)
\end{align}$$

The zeroth cohomology of the longitudinal exterior derivative is the algebra of gauge invariant functions.

The BRST construction applies when one has a Hamiltonian action of a compact, connected Lie group $G$ on a phase space $M$. Let $\mathfrak{g}$ be the Lie algebra of $G$ (via the Lie group–Lie algebra correspondence) and $0 \in \mathfrak{g}^*$ (the dual of $\mathfrak{g})$ a regular value of the momentum map $\Phi: M\to \mathfrak{g}^*$. Let $M_0=\Phi^{-1}(0)$. Assume the $G$-action on $M_0$ is free and proper, and consider the space $\widetilde M = M_0/G$ of $G$-orbits on $M_0$, which is also known as a symplectic reduction quotient $\widetilde M = M/\!\!/G$.

First, using the regular sequence of functions defining $M_0$ inside $M$, construct a Koszul complex

$$\Lambda^\bullet {\mathfrak g} \otimes C^{\infty}(M).$$

The differential, $\delta$, on this complex is an odd $C^\infty(M)$-linear derivation (differential algebra) of the graded $C^\infty(M)$-algebra $\Lambda^\bullet {\mathfrak g} \otimes C^{\infty}(M)$. This odd derivation is defined by extending the Lie algebra homomorphism ${\mathfrak g}\to C^{\infty}(M)$ of the Hamiltonian action. The resulting Koszul complex is the Koszul complex of the $S({\mathfrak g})$-module $C^\infty(M)$, where $S(\mathfrak{g})$ is the symmetric algebra of $\mathfrak{g}$, and the module structure comes from a ring homomorphism $S({\mathfrak g}) \to C^{\infty}(M)$ induced by the Hamiltonian action $\mathfrak{g} \to C^{\infty}(M)$.

This Koszul complex is a resolution of the $S({\mathfrak g})$-module $C^{\infty}(M_0)$, that is,

$$H^{j}(\Lambda^\bullet {\mathfrak g} \otimes C^{\infty}(M),\delta) = \begin{cases} C^{\infty}(M_0) & j = 0 \\ 0 & j \neq 0 \end{cases}$$

Then, consider the Chevalley–Eilenberg complex for the Koszul complex $\Lambda^\bullet {\mathfrak g} \otimes C^{\infty}(M)$ considered as a differential graded module over the Lie algebra $\mathfrak{g}$:

$$K^{\bullet,\bullet} = C^\bullet \left (\mathfrak g,\Lambda^\bullet {\mathfrak g} \otimes C^{\infty}(M) \right ) =  \Lambda^\bullet {\mathfrak g}^* \otimes \Lambda^\bullet {\mathfrak g} \otimes C^{\infty}(M).$$

The "horizontal" differential $d: K^{i,\bullet} \to K^{i+1,\bullet}$ is defined on the coefficients

$$\Lambda^\bullet {\mathfrak g} \otimes C^{\infty}(M)$$

by the action of $\mathfrak{g}$ and on $\Lambda^\bullet {\mathfrak g}^*$ as the exterior derivative of right-invariant differential forms on the Lie group $G$, whose Lie algebra is $\mathfrak{g}$.

Let Tot(K) be a complex such that

$$\operatorname{Tot}(K)^n =\bigoplus\nolimits_{i-j=n} K^{i,j}$$

with a differential D = d + δ. The cohomology groups of (Tot(K), D) are computed using a spectral sequence associated to the double complex $(K^{\bullet,\bullet}, d, \delta)$.

The first term of the spectral sequence computes the cohomology of the "vertical" differential $\delta$:

$E_1^{i,j} = H^j (K^{i,\bullet},\delta) = \Lambda^i {\mathfrak g}^* \otimes C^{\infty}(M_0)$, if j = 0 and zero otherwise.

The first term of the spectral sequence may be interpreted as the complex of vertical differential forms

$$(\Omega^\bullet{\operatorname{vert}}(M_0), d_{\operatorname{vert}})$$

for the fiber bundle $M_0 \to \widetilde M$.

The second term of the spectral sequence computes the cohomology of the "horizontal" differential $d$ on $E_1^{\bullet,\bullet}$:

$E_2^{i,j} \cong H^i(E_1^{\bullet,j},d) = C^{\infty}(M_0)^g = C^{\infty}(\widetilde M)$, if $i = j= 0$ and zero otherwise.

The spectral sequence collapses at the second term, so that $E_{\infty}^{i,j} = E_2^{i,j}$, which is concentrated in degree zero.

Therefore,

$H^p (\operatorname{Tot}(K), D ) = C^{\infty}(M_0)^g = C^{\infty}(\widetilde M)$, if p = 0 and 0 otherwise.

== See also ==
- Batalin–Vilkovisky formalism
- Quantum chromodynamics
