= Chiral anomaly =

Non-conservation of chiral current in physics

In theoretical physics, a chiral anomaly is the anomalous nonconservation of a chiral current. Such events are expected to be prohibited according to classical conservation laws, but it is known there must be ways they can be broken, because we have evidence of charge–parity non-conservation ("CP violation"). It is possible that other imbalances have been caused by breaking of a chiral law of this kind. Many physicists suspect that the fact that the observable universe contains more matter than antimatter is caused by a chiral anomaly. Chiral symmetry breaking, which breaks chirality symmetry for fermions, can also happen without CP violation, which causes mass gaps between mesons in quantum chromodynamics.

== Informal introduction ==
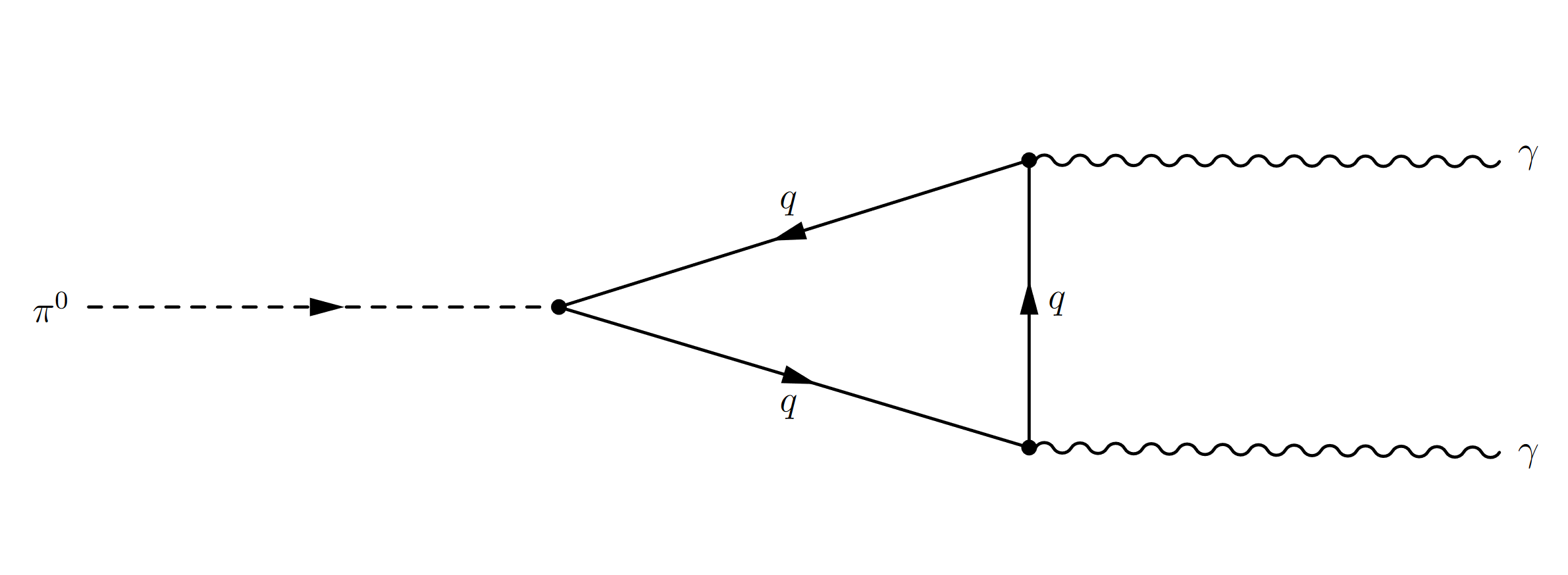
Anomaly-induced neutral pion decay $\pi^0 \to\gamma\gamma~.$ This is a one-loop Feynman diagram. The $\pi^0$ coupling is a pseudoscalar coupling; the two photons couple as vectors. The triangle sums over all lepton generations.

The chiral anomaly originally referred to the anomalous decay rate of the neutral pion, as computed in the current algebra of the chiral model. These calculations suggested that the decay of the pion was suppressed, clearly contradicting experimental results. The nature of the anomalous calculations was first explained in 1969 by Stephen L. Adler and John Stewart Bell and Roman Jackiw. This is called the Adler–Bell–Jackiw anomaly of quantum electrodynamics. This is a symmetry of classical electrodynamics that is violated by quantum corrections.

The Adler–Bell–Jackiw anomaly arises in the following way. If one considers the classical (non-quantized) theory of electromagnetism coupled to massless fermions (electrically charged Dirac spinors solving the Dirac equation), one expects to have not just one but two conserved currents: the ordinary electrical current (the vector current), described by the Dirac field $j^\mu = \overline\psi\gamma^\mu\psi$ as well as an axial current $j_5^\mu = \overline\psi\gamma^5\gamma^\mu\psi~.$ When moving from the classical theory to the quantum theory, one may compute the quantum corrections to these currents; to first order, these are the one-loop Feynman diagrams. These are famously divergent, and require a regularization to be applied, to obtain the renormalized amplitudes. In order for the renormalization to be meaningful, coherent and consistent, the regularized diagrams must obey the same symmetries as the zero-loop (classical) amplitudes. This is the case for the vector current, but not the axial current: it cannot be regularized in such a way as to preserve the axial symmetry. The axial symmetry of classical electrodynamics is broken by quantum corrections. Formally, the Ward–Takahashi identities of the quantum theory follow from the gauge symmetry of the electromagnetic field; the corresponding identities for the axial current are broken.

At the time that the Adler–Bell–Jackiw anomaly was being explored in physics, there were related developments in differential geometry that appeared to involve the same kinds of expressions. These were not in any way related to quantum corrections of any sort, but rather were the exploration of the global structure of fiber bundles, and specifically, of the Dirac operators on spin structures having curvature forms resembling that of the electromagnetic tensor, both in four and three dimensions (the Chern–Simons theory). After considerable discussion, it became clear that the structure of the anomaly could be described with bundles with a non-trivial homotopy group, or, in physics terminology, in terms of instantons.

Instantons are a form of topological soliton; they are a solution to the classical field theory, having the property that they are stable and cannot decay (into plane waves, for example). Put differently: conventional field theory is built on the idea of a vacuum – roughly speaking, a flat empty space. Classically, this is the "trivial" solution; all fields vanish. However, one can also arrange the (classical) fields in such a way that they have a non-trivial global configuration. These non-trivial configurations are also candidates for the vacuum, for empty space; yet they are no longer flat or trivial; they contain a twist, the instanton. The quantum theory is able to interact with these configurations; when it does so, it manifests as the chiral anomaly.

In mathematics, non-trivial configurations are found during the study of Dirac operators in their fully generalized setting, namely, on Riemannian manifolds in arbitrary dimensions. Mathematical tasks include finding and classifying structures and configurations. Famous results include the Atiyah–Singer index theorem for Dirac operators. Roughly speaking, the symmetries of Minkowski spacetime, Lorentz invariance, Laplacians, Dirac operators and the U(1)xSU(2)xSU(3) fiber bundles can be taken to be a special case of a far more general setting in differential geometry; the exploration of the various possibilities accounts for much of the excitement in theories such as string theory; the richness of possibilities accounts for a certain perception of lack of progress.

The Adler–Bell–Jackiw anomaly is seen experimentally, in the sense that it describes the decay of the neutral pion, and specifically, the width of the decay of the neutral pion into two photons. The neutral pion itself was discovered in the 1940s; its decay rate (width) was correctly estimated by J. Steinberger in 1949. The correct form of the anomalous divergence of the axial current is obtained by Schwinger in 1951 in a 2D model of electromagnetism and massless fermions. That the decay of the neutral pion is suppressed in the current algebra analysis of the chiral model is obtained by Sutherland and Veltman in 1967. An analysis and resolution of this anomalous result is provided by Adler and Bell & Jackiw in 1969. A general structure of the anomalies is discussed by Bardeen in 1969.

The quark model of the pion indicates it is a bound state of a quark and an anti-quark. However, the quantum numbers, including parity and angular momentum, taken to be conserved, prohibit the decay of the pion, at least in the zero-loop calculations (quite simply, the amplitudes vanish.) If the quarks are assumed to be massive, not massless, then a chirality-violating decay is allowed; however, it is not of the correct size. (Chirality is not a constant of motion of massive spinors; they will change handedness as they propagate, and so mass is itself a chiral symmetry-breaking term. The contribution of the mass is given by the Sutherland and Veltman result; it is termed "PCAC", the partially conserved axial current.) The Adler–Bell–Jackiw analysis provided in 1969 (as well as the earlier forms by Steinberger and Schwinger), do provide the correct decay width for the neutral pion.

Besides explaining the decay of the pion, it has a second very important role. The one loop amplitude includes a factor that counts the grand total number of leptons that can circulate in the loop. In order to get the correct decay width, one must have exactly three generations of quarks, and not four or more. In this way, it plays an important role in constraining the Standard Model. It provides a direct physical prediction of the number of quarks that can exist in nature.

Current day research is focused on similar phenomena in different settings, including non-trivial topological configurations of the electroweak theory, that is, the sphalerons. Other applications include the hypothetical non-conservation of baryon number in GUTs and other theories.

== General discussion ==
In some theories of fermions with chiral symmetry, the quantization may lead to the breaking of this (global) chiral symmetry. In that case, the charge associated with the chiral symmetry is not conserved. The non-conservation happens in a process of tunneling from one vacuum to another. Such a process is called an instanton.

In the case of a symmetry related to the conservation of a fermionic particle number, one may understand the creation of such particles as follows. The definition of a particle is different in the two vacuum states between which the tunneling occurs; therefore a state of no particles in one vacuum corresponds to a state with some particles in the other vacuum. In particular, there is a Dirac sea of fermions and, when such a tunneling happens, it causes the energy levels of the sea fermions to gradually shift upwards for the particles and downwards for the anti-particles, or vice versa. This means particles which once belonged to the Dirac sea become real (positive energy) particles and particle creation happens.

Technically, in the path integral formulation, an anomalous symmetry is a symmetry of the action $\mathcal A$, but not of the measure μ and therefore not of the generating functional
$$\mathcal Z=\int\! {\exp (i \mathcal A/\hbar) ~ \mathrm{d} \mu}$$
of the quantized theory (ℏ is Planck's action-quantum divided by 2π). The measure $d\mu$ consists of a part depending on the fermion field $[\mathrm{d}\psi]$ and a part depending on its complex conjugate $[\mathrm{d}\bar{\psi}]$. The transformations of both parts under a chiral symmetry do not cancel in general. Note that if $\psi$ is a Dirac fermion, then the chiral symmetry can be written as $\psi \rightarrow e^{i \alpha \gamma^5}\psi$ where $\gamma^5$ is the chiral gamma matrix acting on $\psi$. From the formula for $\mathcal Z$ one also sees explicitly that in the classical limit, ℏ → 0, anomalies don't come into play, since in this limit only the extrema of $\mathcal A$ remain relevant.

The anomaly is proportional to the instanton number of a gauge field to which the fermions are coupled. (Note that the gauge symmetry is always non-anomalous and is exactly respected, as is required for the theory to be consistent.)

== Calculation ==
The chiral anomaly can be calculated exactly by one-loop Feynman diagrams, e.g. Steinberger's "triangle diagram", contributing to the pion decays, and $\pi^0\to e^+e^-\gamma$. The amplitude for this process can be calculated directly from the change in the measure of the fermionic fields under the chiral transformation.

Wess and Zumino developed a set of conditions on how the partition function ought to behave under gauge transformations called the Wess–Zumino consistency condition.

Fujikawa derived this anomaly using the correspondence between functional determinants and the partition function using the Atiyah–Singer index theorem. See Fujikawa's method.

== An example: baryon number non-conservation ==
The Standard Model of electroweak interactions has all the necessary ingredients for successful baryogenesis, although these interactions have never been observed and may be insufficient to explain the total baryon number of the observed universe if the initial baryon number of the universe at the time of the Big Bang is zero. Beyond the violation of charge conjugation $C$ and CP violation $CP$ (charge+parity), baryonic charge violation appears through the Adler–Bell–Jackiw anomaly of the $U(1)$ group.

Baryons are not conserved by the usual electroweak interactions due to quantum chiral anomaly. The classic electroweak Lagrangian conserves baryonic charge. Quarks always enter in bilinear combinations $q\bar q$, so that a quark can disappear only in collision with an antiquark. In other words, the classical baryonic current $J_\mu^B$ is conserved:
$$\partial^\mu J_\mu^B = \sum_j \partial^\mu(\bar q_j \gamma_\mu q_j) = 0.$$
However, quantum corrections known as the sphaleron destroy this conservation law: instead of zero in the right hand side of this equation, there is a non-vanishing quantum term,
$$\partial^\mu J_\mu^B = \frac{g^2 C}{16\pi^2} G^{\mu\nu a} \tilde{G}_{\mu\nu}^a,$$
where C is a numerical constant vanishing for ℏ =0,
$$\tilde{G}_{\mu\nu}^a = \frac{1}{2} \epsilon_{\mu\nu\alpha\beta} G^{\alpha\beta a},$$
and the gauge field strength $G_{\mu\nu}^a$ is given by the expression
$$G_{\mu\nu}^a = \partial_\mu A_\nu^a - \partial_\nu A_\mu^a + g f^{a}_{bc} A_\mu^b A_\nu^c  ~.$$

Electroweak sphalerons can only change the baryon and/or lepton number by 3 or multiples of 3 (collision of three baryons into three leptons/antileptons and vice versa).

An important fact is that the anomalous current non-conservation is proportional to the total derivative of a vector operator, $G^{\mu\nu a}\tilde{G}_{\mu\nu}^a = \partial^\mu K_\mu$ (this is non-vanishing due to instanton configurations of the gauge field, which are pure gauge at the infinity), where the anomalous current $K_\mu$ is
$$K_\mu = 2\epsilon_{\mu\nu\alpha\beta} \left( A^{\nu a} \partial^\alpha A^{\beta a} + \frac{1}{3} f^{abc} A^{\nu a} A^{\alpha b} A^{\beta c} \right),$$
which is the Hodge dual of the Chern–Simons 3-form.

=== Geometric form ===
In the language of differential forms, to any self-dual curvature form $F_A$ we may assign the abelian 4-form $\langle F_A\wedge F_A\rangle:=\operatorname{tr}\left(F_A\wedge F_A\right)$. Chern–Weil theory shows that this 4-form is locally but not globally exact, with potential given by the Chern–Simons 3-form locally:
$$d\mathrm{CS}(A)=\langle F_A\wedge F_A\rangle.$$

Again, this is true only on a single chart, and is false for the global form $\langle F_\nabla\wedge F_\nabla\rangle$ unless the instanton number vanishes.

To proceed further, we attach a "point at infinity" k onto $\mathbb{R}^4$ to yield $S^4$, and use the clutching construction to chart principal A-bundles, with one chart on the neighborhood of k and a second on $S^4-k$. The thickening around k, where these charts intersect, is trivial, so their intersection is essentially $S^3$. Thus instantons are classified by the third homotopy group $\pi_3(A)$, which for $A = \mathrm{SU(2)}\cong S^3$ is simply the third 3-sphere group $\pi_3(S^3)=\mathbb{Z}$.

The divergence of the baryon number current is (ignoring numerical constants)
$$\mathbf{d}\star j_b = \langle F_\nabla\wedge F_\nabla\rangle,$$
and the instanton number is
$$\int_{S^4} \langle F_\nabla\wedge F_\nabla\rangle\in\mathbb{N}.$$

== See also ==
- Anomaly (physics)
- Chiral magnetic effect
- Global anomaly
- Gravitational anomaly
- Strong CP problem
