= Global anomaly =

Quantum breakdown of large gauge transformations

== Primary examples ==
In theoretical physics, a global anomaly is a type of anomaly: in this particular case, it is a quantum effect that invalidates a large gauge transformation that would otherwise be preserved in the classical theory. This leads to an inconsistency in the theory because the space of configurations which is being integrated over in the functional integral involves both a configuration and the same configuration after a large gauge transformation has acted upon it and the sum of all such contributions is zero and the space of configurations cannot be split into connected components for which the integral is nonzero.

Alternatively, the existence of a global anomaly implies that the measure of Feynman's functional integral cannot be defined globally.

The adjective "global" refers to the properties of a group that are detectable via large gauge or diffeomorphism transformations, but are not detectable locally via infinitesimal transformations. For example, all features of a discrete group (as opposed to a Lie group) are global in character.

A famous example is an SU(2) Yang–Mills theory in 4D with an odd number of chiral fermions in the fundamental representation 2 or the isospin 1/2 of SU(2), transforming as doublets under SU(2). This is known as the Witten SU(2) anomaly.

Another new but much more subtle example is found in 2018, also for the SU(2) gauge theory in 4D, with an odd number of chiral fermions in the representation 4 or the isospin 3/2 of SU(2). This is known as the new SU(2) anomaly. The new SU(2) anomaly has an important application to rule out the existence of any global anomaly for the SO(10) grand unified theory. This new anomaly is a mixed gauge-gravitational anomaly and a nonperturbative global anomaly.

Many types of global anomalies must be canceled for a theory to be consistent. An example is modular invariance, the requirement of anomaly cancellation for a part of a global gravitational anomaly that deals with the large diffeomorphisms over two dimensional worldsheets of genus 1 or more.

== Applications to beyond the Standard Model physics ==
In 2020, a concept known as "ultra unification" was introduced. It combines the Standard Model and grand unification, particularly for the models with 15 Weyl fermions per generation, without the necessity of right-handed sterile neutrinos, by adding new gapped topological phase sectors or new gapless interacting conformal sectors consistent with the nonperturbative global anomaly cancellation and cobordism constraints (especially from the mixed gauge-gravitational anomaly, such as a Z/16Z class anomaly, associated with the baryon minus lepton number B−L and the electroweak hypercharge Y).

Gapped topological phase sectors are constructed via the symmetry extension (in contrast to the symmetry breaking in the Standard Model's Anderson-Higgs mechanism), whose low energy contains unitary Lorentz invariant Schwarz type topological quantum field theories (TQFTs such as Chern-Simons theory), such as 4-dimensional noninvertible, 5-dimensional noninvertible, or 5-dimensional invertible entangled gapped phase TQFTs.

Alternatively, ultra unification suggests there could also be right-handed sterile neutrinos, gapless unparticle physics, or some combination of more general interacting conformal field theories (CFTs), to together cancel the mixed gauge-gravitational anomaly. This proposal can also be understood as coupling the Standard Model (as quantum field theory) to the Beyond the Standard Model sector (as TQFTs or CFTs being dark matter) via the discrete gauged B−L topological force.

In a colloquium summary, ultra unification has two conceptual additions to the Standard Model. First, beyond-the-Standard-Model dark matter partly consists of topological order with low energy TQFT, while there are anyon statistics string excitations above the energy gap. Second, there exists the fifth force as a topological discrete gauge force of B−L that mediates between the Standard Model particles, beyond-the-Standard-Model topological order dark matter, and gapped anyon string non-particle excitations.

In either TQFT or CFT scenarios, the implication is that a new high-energy physics frontier beyond the conventional 0-dimensional particle physics relies on new types of topological forces and matter. This includes gapped extended objects such as 1-dimensional line and 2-dimensional surface operators or conformal defects, whose open ends carry deconfined fractionalized particle or anyonic string excitations.

Understanding and characterizing these gapped extended objects requires mathematical concepts such as cohomology, cobordism, or category into particle physics. The topological phase sectors signify a departure from the conventional particle physics paradigm, indicating a frontier in beyond-the-Standard-Model physics.
