= Green–Schwarz mechanism =

Mechanism in superstring theory

The Green–Schwarz mechanism (sometimes called the Green–Schwarz anomaly cancellation mechanism) is the main discovery that started the first superstring revolution in superstring theory.

== Discovery ==
In 1984, Michael Green and John H. Schwarz realized that the anomaly in type I string theory with the gauge group SO(32) cancels because of an extra "classical" contribution from a 2-form field. They realized that one of the necessary conditions for a superstring theory to make sense is that the dimension of the gauge group of type I string theory must be 496 and then demonstrated this to be so.

In the original calculation, gauge anomalies, mixed anomalies, and gravitational anomalies were expected to arise from a hexagon Feynman diagram. For the special choice of the gauge group SO(32) or E8 x E8, however, the anomaly factorizes and may be cancelled by a tree diagram. In string theory, this indeed occurs. The tree diagram describes the exchange of a virtual quantum of the B-field. It is somewhat counterintuitive to see that a tree diagram cancels a one-loop diagram, but in reality, both of these diagrams arise as one-loop diagrams in superstring theory in which the anomaly cancellation is more transparent.

As recounted in The Elegant Universe's TV version, in the second episode, "The String's the Thing", section "Wrestling with String Theory", Green describes finding 496 on each side of the equals sign during a stormy night filled with lightning, and fondly recalls joking that "the gods are trying to prevent us from completing this calculation". Green soon entitled some of his subsequent lectures "The Theory of Everything".

== Details ==
Anomalies in quantum theory arise from one-loop diagrams, with a chiral fermion in the loop and gauge fields, Ricci tensors, or global symmetry currents as the external legs. These diagrams have the form of a triangle in 4 spacetime dimensions, which generalizes to a hexagon in D = 10, thus involving 6 external lines. The interesting anomaly in SUSY D = 10 gauge theory is the hexagon which has a particular linear combination of the two-form gauge field strength and Ricci tensor, $F^6,\ F^4 R^2,\ F^2 R^4,\ R^6$, for the external lines.

Green and Schwarz realized that one can add a so-called Chern–Simons term to the classical action, having the form $S_{GS} = \int B_{2}\wedge X_8$, where the integral is over the 10 dimensions, $B_{2}$ is the rank-two Kalb–Ramond field, and $X_8$ is a gauge invariant combination of $F^4,\ F^2 R^2,\ R^4$ (with space-time indices not contracted), which is precisely one of the factors appearing in the hexagon anomaly. If the variation of $B_{2}$ under the transformations of gauge field for $F_{(2)}$ and under general coordinate transformations is appropriately specified, then the Green–Schwarz term $S_{GS}$, when combined with a trilinear vertex through exchange of a gauge boson, has precisely the right variation to cancel the hexagon anomaly.
