= Alain Rouet =

French physicist (born 1942)

Alain Rouet (born 1942 in France) is a French theoretical physicist, entrepreneur, poet, and novelist.

== Education and career ==
At the École Centrale des Arts et Manufactures, Rouet graduated in 1969 with an engineering degree and in 1974 with a doctorate in theoretical physics. He worked as a postdoc for the academic year 1975–1976 at the Max Planck Institute for Astrophysics (MPA) in Munich and from 1976 to 1978 at CERN. From 1979 to 1981 he was a scientist at the CNRS at the CPT (Centre de Physique Theorique) in Marseille-Luminy. At the same time, he acted in an advisory capacity for Aérospatiale and the French Atomic Energy Commission. From 1981 to 1982 he was Einstein Professor at the Institute for Advanced Study. He then moved into industry and from 1983 to 1986 was the technical director of a Thomson Group company Vidéolor, which developed television tubes.

From 1986 to 2017 he was involved in the creation and development of Science & Tec, a kind of scientific think tank that provided scientific consulting services for industry. Clients included AREVA, Bosch, EADS, and TotalEnergies. Rouet was involved in the creation and support of Science & Tec subsidiaries in Germany and Italy. From 1996 to 2003 he created and developed Quantaflow, a company that designed, manufactured, and sold an innovative system of software and hardware that counted people at places like shopping centers and airports. The Quantaflow system provided distributed architecture and web services to managers and employees for analysis and certification of customer visits.

Rouet is known for his collaborative development in the mid-1970s with Raymond Stora and Carlo Becchi of the BRST formalism (independently done by Igor Tyutin). The formalism is a method for quantizing a field theory with a gauge symmetry. In addition to quantum field theory, Rouet also did research on dynamical systems.

He received, jointly with Stora, Becchi, and Tyutin, the 2009 Dannie Heineman Prize for Mathematical Physics.

== Selected publications ==
- Becchi, C.; Rouet, A.; Stora, R. (1974). "The abelian Higgs Kibble model, unitarity of the S-operator". Physics Letters B. 52 (3): 344–346. Bibcode:1974PhLB...52..344B. doi:10.1016/0370-2693(74)90058-6.
- Becchi, C.; Rouet, A.; Stora, R. (1975). "Renormalization of the abelian Higgs-Kibble model". Communications in Mathematical Physics. 42 (2): 127–162. Bibcode:1975CMaPh..42..127B. doi:10.1007/BF01614158. S2CID 120552882.
- Becchi, C.; Rouet, A.; Stora, R. (1976). "Renormalization of gauge theories". Annals of Physics. 98 (2): 287–321. Bibcode:1976AnPhy..98..287B. doi:10.1016/0003-4916(76)90156-1.
- Piguet, O.; Rouet, A. (1976). "Supersymmetric BPHZ renormalization". Nuclear Physics B. 108 (2): 265–274. doi:10.1016/0550-3213(76)90552-6.
- Rouet, A. (1976). "Pure massless electrodynamics in Veltman's gauge". Communications in Mathematical Physics. 48 (1): 89–96. Bibcode:1976CMaPh..48...89R. doi:10.1007/BF01609414. S2CID 123244702.
- Amati, D.; Rouet, A. (1978). "Gauge unambiguous quantization of Yang-Mills theory around classical solutions". Physics Letters B. 73 (1): 39–41. Bibcode:1978PhLB...73...39A. doi:10.1016/0370-2693(78)90166-1.
- Rouet, A. (1978). "Callan—symanzik β(g) function in different topological sectors". Physics Letters B. 78 (5): 608–610. Bibcode:1978PhLB...78..608R. doi:10.1016/0370-2693(78)90651-2.
- Piguet, O.; Rouet, A. (1981). "Symmetries in perturbative quantum field theory". Physics Reports. 76 (1): 1–77. Bibcode:1981PhR....76....1P. doi:10.1016/0370-1573(81)90066-1.
- Richard, J.L.; Rouet, A. (1981). "Complex saddle points in the double well oscillator". Nuclear Physics B. 183 (1–2): 251–268. Bibcode:1981NuPhB.183..251R. doi:10.1016/0550-3213(81)90555-1.
- Richard, J.L.; Rouet, A. (1981). "Complex saddle points versus dilute-gas approximation in the double-well anharmonic oscillator". Nuclear Physics B. 185 (1): 47–60. Bibcode:1981NuPhB.185...47R. doi:10.1016/0550-3213(81)90363-1.
- Becchi, C.; Rouet, A.; Stora, A. (1981). "Renormalizable Theories with Symmetry Breaking". Field Theory, Quantization and Statistical Physics. pp. 3–32. arXiv:1607.05458. doi:10.1007/978-94-009-8368-7_1. ISBN 978-94-009-8370-0. S2CID 119204070.
- Richard, Jean-Louis; Rouet, Alain (1983). "The CP1 model on the torus". Nuclear Physics B. 211 (3): 447–464. doi:10.1016/0550-3213(83)90109-8.
- Rouet, Alain (2008). "Theoretical Physics in Real Life". International Journal of Geometric Methods in Modern Physics. 05 (8): 1337–1343. Bibcode:2008IJGMM..05.1337R. doi:10.1142/S0219887808003338.
