= Tyutin =

Tyutin is a Russian surname. Notable people with the surname include:

- Fedor Tyutin (born 1983), Russian ice hockey player
- Igor Tyutin (1940–2026), Russian theoretical physicist
