= Fujikawa method =

Method of calculating chiral anomalies

In physics, Fujikawa's method is a way of deriving the chiral anomaly in quantum field theory. It uses the correspondence between functional determinants and the partition function, effectively making use of the Atiyah–Singer index theorem.

== Derivation ==
Suppose given a Dirac field $\psi$ which transforms according to a representation $\rho$ of the compact Lie group G; and we have a background connection form of taking values in the Lie algebra $\mathfrak{g}\,.$ The Dirac operator (in Feynman slash notation) is

$$D\!\!\!\!/\ \stackrel{\mathrm{def}}{=}\  \partial\!\!\!/ + i A\!\!\!/$$

and the fermionic action is given by

$$\int d^dx\, \overline{\psi}iD\!\!\!\!/ \psi$$

The partition function is

$$Z[A]=\int \mathcal{D}\overline{\psi}\mathcal{D}\psi\,e^{-\int d^dx\,\overline{\psi}iD\!\!\!/\,\psi}.$$

The axial symmetry transformation goes as

$$\psi\to e^{i\gamma_{d+1}\alpha(x)}\psi\,$$
$$\overline{\psi}\to \overline{\psi}e^{i\gamma_{d+1}\alpha(x)}$$
$$S\to S + \int d^dx \,\alpha(x)\partial_\mu\left(\overline{\psi}\gamma^\mu\gamma_{d+1}\psi\right)$$

Classically, this implies that the chiral current, $j_{d+1}^\mu \equiv \overline{\psi}\gamma^\mu\gamma_{d+1}\psi$ is conserved, $0 = \partial_\mu j_{d+1}^\mu$.

Quantum mechanically, the chiral current is not conserved: Jackiw discovered this due to the non-vanishing of a triangle diagram. Fujikawa reinterpreted this as a change in the partition function measure under a chiral transformation. To calculate a change in the measure under a chiral transformation, first consider the Dirac fermions in a basis of eigenvectors of the Dirac operator:

$$\psi = \sum\limits_{i}\psi_ia^i,$$
$$\overline\psi = \sum\limits_{i}\psi_i^\dagger \overline b^i,$$

where $\{a^i,\overline b^i\}$ are Grassmann valued coefficients, and $\{\psi_i\}$ are eigenvectors of the Dirac operator:

$$D\!\!\!\!/ \psi_i = -\lambda_i\psi_i.$$

The eigenfunctions are taken to be orthonormal with respect to integration in d-dimensional space,

$$\delta_i^j = \int\frac{d^dx}{(2\pi)^d}\psi^{\dagger j}(x)\psi_i(x).$$

The measure of the path integral is then defined to be:

$$\mathcal{D}\psi\mathcal{D}\overline{\psi} = \prod\limits_i da^id\overline {b}^i$$

Under an infinitesimal chiral transformation, write

$$\psi \to \psi^\prime = (1+i\alpha\gamma_{d+1})\psi = \sum\limits_i \psi_ia^{\prime i},$$
$$\overline\psi \to \overline{\psi}^\prime = \overline{\psi}(1+i\alpha\gamma_{d+1}) = \sum\limits_i \psi^\dagger_i\overline{b}^{\prime i}.$$

The Jacobian of the transformation can now be calculated, using the orthonormality of the eigenvectors

$$C^i_j \equiv \left(\frac{\delta a}{\delta a^\prime}\right)^i_j = \int d^dx \,\psi^{\dagger i}(x)[1-i\alpha(x)\gamma_{d+1}]\psi_j(x) = \delta^i_j\, - i\int d^dx \,\alpha(x)\psi^{\dagger i}(x)\gamma_{d+1}\psi_j(x).$$

The transformation of the coefficients $\{b_i\}$ are calculated in the same manner. Finally, the quantum measure changes as

$$\mathcal{D}\psi\mathcal{D}\overline{\psi} = \prod\limits_i da^i d\overline{b}^i = \prod\limits_i da^{\prime i}d\overline{b}^{\prime i}{\det}^{-2}(C^i_j),$$

where the Jacobian is the reciprocal of the determinant because the integration variables are Grassmannian, and the 2 appears because the a's and b's contribute equally. We can calculate the determinant by standard techniques:

$$\begin{align}{\det}^{-2}(C^i_j) &= \exp\left[-2{\rm tr}\ln(\delta^i_j-i\int d^dx\, \alpha(x)\psi^{\dagger i}(x)\gamma_{d+1}\psi_j(x))\right]\\
&= \exp\left[2i\int d^dx\, \alpha(x)\psi^{\dagger i}(x)\gamma_{d+1}\psi_i(x)\right]\end{align}$$

to first order in α(x).

Specialising to the case where α is a constant, the Jacobian must be regularised because the integral is ill-defined as written. Fujikawa employed heat-kernel regularization, such that

$$\begin{align}-2{\rm tr}\ln C^i_j &= 2i\lim\limits_{M\to\infty}\alpha\int d^dx \,\psi^{\dagger i}(x)\gamma_{d+1} e^{-\lambda_i^2/M^2}\psi_i(x)\\
&= 2i\lim\limits_{M\to\infty}\alpha\int d^dx\, \psi^{\dagger i}(x)\gamma_{d+1} e^{{D\!\!\!/\,}^2/M^2}\psi_i(x)\end{align}$$

(${D\!\!\!\!/}^2$ can be re-written as $D^2+\tfrac{1}{4}[\gamma^\mu,\gamma^\nu]F_{\mu\nu}$, and the eigenfunctions can be expanded in a plane-wave basis)

$$= 2i\lim\limits_{M\to\infty}\alpha\int d^dx\int\frac{d^dk}{(2\pi)^d}\int\frac{d^dk^\prime}{(2\pi)^d} \psi^{\dagger i}(k^\prime)e^{ik^\prime x}\gamma_{d+1} e^{-k^2/M^2+1/(4M^2)[\gamma^\mu,\gamma^\nu]F_{\mu\nu}}e^{-ikx}\psi_i(k)$$
$$= -\frac{-2\alpha}{(2\pi)^{d/2}(\frac{d}{2})!}(F)^{d/2},$$

after applying the completeness relation for the eigenvectors, performing the trace over γ-matrices, and taking the limit in M. The result is expressed in terms of the field strength 2-form, $F \equiv \tfrac{1}{2}F_{\mu\nu}\,dx^\mu\wedge dx^\nu\,.$

This result is equivalent to $(\tfrac{d}{2})^{\rm th}$ Chern class of the $\mathfrak{g}$-bundle over the d-dimensional base space, and gives the chiral anomaly, responsible for the non-conservation of the chiral current.
