= Large gauge transformation =

Topologically nontrivial gauge transformations

Given a topological space M, a topological group G and a principal G-bundle over M, a global section of that principal bundle is a gauge fixing and the process of replacing one section by another is a gauge transformation. If a gauge transformation isn't homotopic to the identity, it is called a large gauge transformation. In theoretical physics, M often is a manifold and G is a Lie group.

== See also ==
- Large diffeomorphism
- Global anomaly
