= Anomaly matching condition =

Principle in quantum field theory

In quantum field theory, the anomaly matching condition by Gerard 't Hooft states that the calculation of any chiral anomaly for the flavor symmetry must not depend on what scale is chosen for the calculation if it is done by using the degrees of freedom of the theory at some energy scale. It is also known as the 't Hooft condition and the 't Hooft UV-IR anomaly matching condition. (Note: In the context of quantum field theory, "UV" actually means the high-energy limit of a theory, and "IR" means the low-energy limit, by analogy to the upper and lower peripheries of visible light, but not actually meaning either light or those particular energies.)

== 't Hooft anomalies ==
There are two closely related but different types of obstructions to formulating a quantum field theory which are both called anomalies: chiral, or Adler–Bell–Jackiw anomalies, and 't Hooft anomalies.

If a symmetry of a given theory has a 't Hooft anomaly, it means that the symmetry is an exact global symmetry of the quantum theory, but there is some impediment to using it as a gauge in the theory.

As an example of a 't Hooft anomaly, consider quantum chromodynamics with $N_f$ massless fermions: This is the $SU(N_c)$ gauge theory with $N_f$ massless Dirac fermions. This theory has the global symmetry $SU(N_f)_L\times SU(N_f)_R\times U(1)_V$, which is often called the flavor symmetry, and this has a 't Hooft anomaly.

== Anomaly matching for continuous symmetry ==
The anomaly matching condition by Gerard 't Hooft proposes that a 't Hooft anomaly of continuous symmetry can be computed both in the high-energy and low-energy degrees of freedom - "ultraviolet" (UV) and "infrared" (IR) - and give the same answer.

=== Example ===
For example, consider the quantum chromodynamics with N_{f} massless quarks. This theory has the flavor symmetry $SU(N_f)_L\times SU(N_f)_R\times U(1)_V$. This flavor symmetry $SU(N_f)_L\times SU(N_f)_R\times U(1)_V$becomes anomalous when the background gauge field is introduced. Either the degrees of freedom at the far low energy limit (far IR) or the degrees of freedom at the far high energy limit (far UV) may be used in order to calculate the anomaly, but the particles and dynamics considered will differ. In the former case, the relevant particles to consider are massless fermions or Nambu–Goldstone bosons (which may be composite particles), while in the latter the only relevant particles are the elementary fermions of the underlying short-distance theory. In both cases however, the answer must be the same. In the case of QCD, the chiral symmetry breaking occurs and the Wess–Zumino–Witten term for the Nambu–Goldstone bosons reproduces the anomaly.

=== Proof ===
The condition can be proved by the following procedure: it is permitted to add to the theory a gauge field which couples to the gauge current related with this symmetry, as well as chiral fermions which couple only to this gauge field, and cancel the anomaly (so that the gauge symmetry will remain non-anomalous, as needed for consistency).

Taking the limit where the coupling constants vanish recovers the original theory, plus the added fermions; these remain good degrees of freedom at every energy scale, as they are free fermions at this limit. The gauge symmetry anomaly can be computed at any energy scale, and must always be zero, so that the theory is consistent. The anomaly of the symmetry in the original theory is then found by subtracting the added free fermions, and the result is independent of the energy scale.

=== Alternative proof ===
Another way to prove the anomaly matching for continuous symmetries is to use the anomaly inflow mechanism. To be specific, consider four-dimensional spacetime in the following:

For global continuous symmetries $G$, introduce the background gauge field $A$ and compute the effective action $\Gamma[A]$. If there is a 't Hooft anomaly for $G$, the effective action $\Gamma[A]$ is not invariant under the $G$ gauge transformation on the background gauge field $A$ and it cannot be restored by adding any four-dimensional local counter terms of $A$. Wess–Zumino consistency condition shows that this can be made gauge-invariant by adding the five-dimensional Chern–Simons action.

With the extra dimension, the effective action $\Gamma[A]$ can now be defined by using the low-energy effective theory that only contains the massless degrees of freedom by integrating out massive fields. Since it must be again gauge invariant by adding the same five-dimensional Chern–Simons term, the 't Hooft anomaly does not change by integrating out massive degrees of freedom.

== See also ==
- 't Hooft–Polyakov monopole
- 't Hooft loop
- 't Hooft symbol
