= Gordon Walter Semenoff =

Gordon Walter Semenoff (born July 11, 1953), OC, FRSC, is a theoretical physicist and professor of physics at the University of British Columbia, Canada. He is known for his research on quantum mechanics, quantum field theory, statistical mechanics and string theory and is particularly famous for his co-invention, together with Antti Niemi, of the parity anomaly in odd-dimensional gauge field theories and for his pioneering work on graphene. He is also well known for development of thermal field theory, the application of index theorems and their generalizations in quantum field theory and string theory, notably with respect to the duality between string theories and gauge field theories.

== Education and career ==
Gordon Semenoff was born on July 11, 1953, in Pincher Creek, Alberta, Canada, where he attended Matthew Halton High School, graduating in the Class of 1971. After completing Bachelor of Science (1976) and Doctor of Philosophy (1981) degrees at the University of Alberta in Edmonton, Gordon spent one year, 1981–1982, as a postdoctoral fellow at the University of Alberta and the subsequent year, 1982–1983, as a postdoctoral fellow at the Center for Theoretical Physics of the Massachusetts Institute of Technology (MIT). In 1983 he was appointed a university research fellow at the University of British Columbia and has spent the remainder of his career to date at that institution, being promoted to full professor in 1990. He has held a number of prestigious visiting appointments, including membership at the Institute for Advanced Study in Princeton, New Jersey, in 1984, 1985 and 2000, and visiting professorships at Eidgenössische Technische Hochschule (ETH) in Zurich, Switzerland, in 1986, Hokkaido University in Hokkaido, Japan, in 1989, the Niels Bohr Institute in Copenhagen, Denmark, in 1989, 1999 and 2012, Uppsala University in Uppsala, Sweden, in 2000, the Institut Henri Poincaré in Paris, France, in 2001 and 2011, the Institut des Hautes Études Scientifiques (IHES) in Bures sur Yvette, France, in 2005, 2006 and 2020, the Isaac Newton Institute in Cambridge, U.K. in 2007 and 2012 and the University of Tours in Tours, France, in 2008.

== Awards ==
- Jacob Biely Research Prize, University of British Columbia, 2013
- Officer of the Order of Canada, 2012
- Queen Elizabeth II Diamond Jubilee Medal, 2012
- Lifetime Achievement Award of the Canadian Association of Physicists, 2012
- Doctor of Science, honoris causa, University of Lethbridge, Canada, 2011
- Brockhouse Medal for Achievement in Condensed Matter and Material Physics (Canadian Association of Physicists) 2010
- Majorana Prize 2006
- CAP-CRM Prize in Theoretical and Mathematical Physics, 2000
- Elected as a Fellow of the Royal Society of Canada in 2000
- Macdowell Medal of the University of British Columbia in 1990
- Japan Society for the Promotion of Science Fellowship, 1989
- Killam Research Prize, University of British Columbia, 1989
- NSERC University Research Fellowship, 1983
- NSERC Postdoctoral Fellowship, 1982
- Alberta Graduate Fellowship 1980–1981
- NSERC Postgraduate Fellowship 1976–1980

== Publications ==
- Quantum Field Theory, An Introduction, Springer Nature Singapore Pte Ltd. (2023)
