= Carlo Becchi =

Italian physicist (1939–2025)

Carlo M. Becchi
- Born: 20 October 1939; Turin, Italy
- Died: 15 September 2025 (aged 85)
- Known for: BRST formalism
- Awards: Dannie Heineman Prize for Mathematical Physics (2009)
- Scientific career
- Fields: Physics
- Institutions: University of Genoa

Carlo Maria Becchi (Italian: [ˈkarlo ˈbekki]; 20 October 1939 – 15 September 2025) was an Italian theoretical physicist.

== Life and career ==
Becchi was born on 20 October 1939. He studied at the University of Genoa, where he received his university degree in physics in 1962. In 1976, he became full professor for theoretical physics at the University of Genoa. Twice (first in 1983), he was chairman of the physics faculty there. From 1997 to 2003 he was the chairman of the theory committee of the Istituto Nazionale di Fisica Nucleare (INFN).

He began by looking into the photoelectric effect in nuclear physics (topic of his thesis). In the 1960s he worked on quarks and the associated unitary symmetries. Since 1971 he has done work on renormalization theory. Becchi became known for his development around 1975 with Raymond Stora and Alain Rouet of the BRST formalism (independently done by Igor Tyutin), which is a method of quantization of systems with secondary conditions like gauge theory. In 2009 as recognition of the BRST formalism, he received the Dannie Heineman Prize for Mathematical Physics with Stora, Rouet, and Tyutin. Since 1991 he was supervisory editor of the journal Nuclear Physics B.

Becchi died on 15 September 2025, at the age of 85.

== Selected publications ==
- with Giovanni Ridolfi: Introduction to relativistic processes and the standard model of electroweak interactions, Springer 2005; Becchi, Carlo M.; Ridolfi, Giovanni (19 May 2014). 2014 2nd edition. Springer. ISBN 978-3-319-06129-0.
- with Rouet, Stora: The Abelian Higgs-Kibble-Model. Unitarity of the S-Operator, Physics Letters B, Vol.52, 1974, pp. 344–346 doi:10.1016/0370-2693(74)90058-6
