= Wendell H. Furry =

American theoretical physicist (1907–1984)

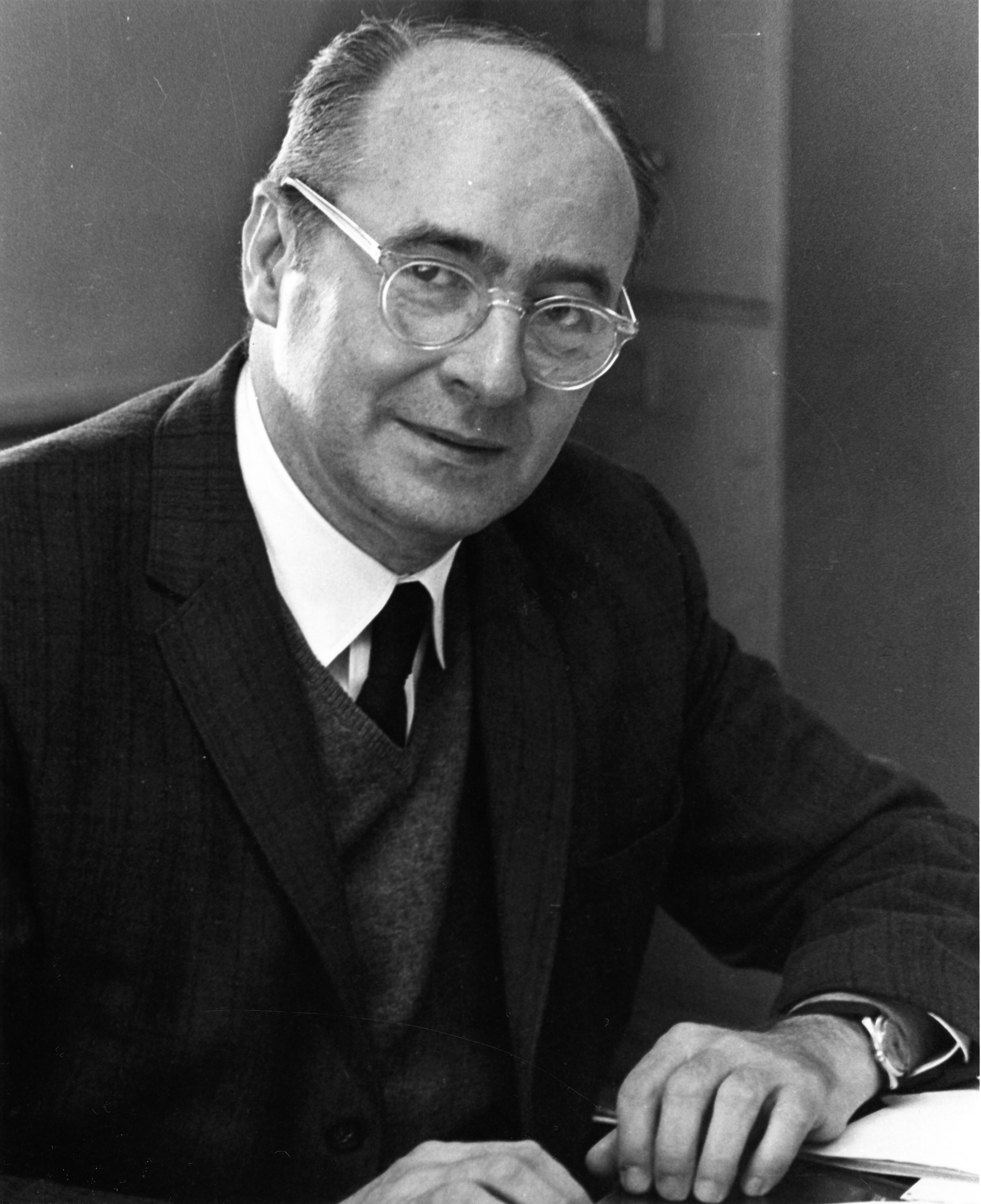
- Born: Wendell Hinkle Furry; February 18, 1907; Prairieton, Indiana, U.S.
- Died: December 17, 1984 (aged 77); Cambridge, Massachusetts, U.S.
- Education: University of Illinois
- Known for: Furry's theorem Neutrinoless double beta decay
- Scientific career
- Fields: Quantum field theory
- Workplaces: Harvard University
- Doctoral advisor: James Holley Bartlett
- Doctoral students: Rolf Landauer

Wendell Hinkle Furry (February 18, 1907 – December 17, 1984) was a professor of physics at Harvard University who made contributions to theoretical and particle physics. Furry's theorem is named after him. He was also the first to propose the search for neutrinoless double beta decay.

== Early life ==
Wendell Furry was born in Prairieton, Indiana on February 18, 1907. He earned an A.B. degree from DePauw University in 1928 and an A.M. and Ph.D. from the University of Illinois in 1930 and 1932, respectively.

== Career ==
Furry made contributions to the early development of quantum field theory with J. Robert Oppenheimer, Vladimir Fock, and others. In 1937, he published a theorem to simplify calculation while studying positron reactions. Furry's theorem shows that the amplitude of a Feynman diagram which consists of a closed loop of fermion lines with an odd number of vertices, vanishes.

Furry, inspired by Maria Goeppert Mayer's theory of double beta decay, noted that if neutrino were a Majorana fermion (a particle that is its own antiparticle), there would exist neutrinoless double beta decay processes. Modern experiments are still looking for this reaction.

During World War II, he worked on radar at the MIT Radiation Laboratory. He was a Guggenheim Fellow in 1949.

After the war, Furry continued teaching at Harvard, later becoming a full professor and serving for three years as chairman of the physics department from 1965 to 1968. After several years of half-time partial retirement, he accepted full retirement in 1977.

== McCarthyism ==
In 1953, Furry was subpoenaed several times as a suspected communist by the House Un-American Activities Committee and by U.S. Senator Joseph R. McCarthy, and invoked his Fifth Amendment privilege in refusing to answer questions about his past membership in the Communist Party. In early 1954, he dropped the Fifth Amendment defense in a nationally televised hearing before Senator McCarthy and answered questions about himself, but refused to name others. He was indicted for contempt of Congress but the case was dropped several years later.

Furry was defended by newly appointed Harvard president Nathan M. Pusey, who refused McCarthy's demands that Furry be fired. He co-authored a general physics text of the time with Purcell and J. C. Street.

Furry taught himself Russian and for many years supplemented his income by translating and editing Russian physics journals published by the American Institute of Physics. He later played a significant role in the writing of Irving Emin's Russian—English Physics Dictionary (New York: John Wiley & Sons, 1963), a work that is still widely used today. Furry's contribution is acknowledged in the preface on p. vii.

As part of his wartime work at the MIT Radiation Laboratory he did significant, still useful work on radar propagation that is documented in Chapter 2 (pp. 27–180) in Vol. 13, Propagation of Short Radio Waves, edited by Donald E. Kerr, as a part of the Massachusetts Institute of Technology Radiation Laboratory Series, McGraw-Hill Book Company, 1951.

== Death ==
Furry died in Cambridge, Massachusetts on December 17, 1984, aged 77.

== Works ==
- Physics for science and engineering students (1952)

== See also ==
- Antiparticle
- Double beta decay
- Neutrinoless double beta decay
