= Igor Tyutin =

Russian physicist

Igor Viktorovich Tyutin (Russian: И́горь Ви́кторович Тю́тин, transliteration: Igor' Viktorovič Tyutin; 24 August 1940 – 23 January 2026) was a Russian theoretical physicist, who worked on quantum field theory.

Tyutin was a professor at the Lebedev Institute in Moscow. In an unpublished Lebedev Institute report, he developed the BRST formalism around 1975 in Russia in parallel to and independently of the work of Carlo Becchi, Alain Rouet, and Raymond Stora in France. The BRST formalism is a method for quantization of fields with constraints such as gauge invariance. In quantum field theory, the procedure is of fundamental importance for attempts at constructing string field theories. In 2009 Tyutin received the Dannie Heineman Prize for Mathematical Physics with Carlo Becchi, Alain Rouet, and Raymond Stora.
