= Raymond Stora =

French physicist

- Born: 18 September 1930; Paris, France
- Died: 20 July 2015 (aged 84); Geneva, Switzerland
- Education: École Polytechnique, Massachusetts Institute of Technology
- Known for: BRST quantization Froissart–Stora equation
- Awards: Dannie Heineman Prize for Mathematical Physics (2009); Max Planck Medal (1998); Prix Jean Ricard (1992)
- Scientific career
- Fields: Physics
- Workplaces: French National Centre for Scientific Research (CNRS); Laboratoire d'Annecy-le-Vieux de physique des particules
- Doctoral advisor: Victor Weisskopf
- Doctoral students: Jean Bellissard; Frédéric Pham

Raymond Félix Stora (18 September 1930 – 20 July 2015) was a French theoretical physicist. He was a researcher at Service de Physique Théorique at CEA Saclay, then a research director at the French National Centre for Scientific Research (CNRS) at CPT Marseille and at LAPP Annecy, as well as a member of CERN's theory group. His work focused on particle physics.

Stora studied at the École Polytechnique from 1951 to 1953, and then at Massachusetts Institute of Technology (MIT), where he received a doctorate in 1958 under the supervision of Victor Weisskopf. Stora's most influential contribution to physics was his work with Carlo Becchi and Alain Rouet on a rigorous mathematical procedure for quantizing non-Abelian gauge field theories, which dates from the mid 1970s and is now known as BRST quantization.

Stora was elected as a correspondent to the physics section of the French Academy of Sciences in 1994. In 2009, he was awarded the Dannie Heineman Prize for Mathematical Physics. CNRS held a special conference in his honour some months after his 80th birthday.
