= Functional determinant =

Determinant in functional analysis

In functional analysis, a branch of mathematics, it is sometimes possible to generalize the notion of the determinant of a square matrix of finite order (representing a linear transformation from a finite-dimensional vector space to itself) to the infinite-dimensional case of a linear operator S mapping a function space V to itself. The corresponding quantity det(S) is called the functional determinant of S.

There are several formulas for the functional determinant. They are all based on the fact that the determinant of a finite matrix is equal to the product of the eigenvalues of the matrix. A mathematically rigorous definition is via the zeta function of the operator,

$$\zeta_S(a) = \operatorname{tr}\, S^{-a} \,,$$

where tr stands for the functional trace: the determinant is then defined by

$$\det S = e^{-\zeta_S'(0)} \,,$$

where the zeta function in the point s = 0 is defined by analytic continuation. Another possible generalization, often used by physicists when using the Feynman path integral formalism in quantum field theory (QFT), uses a functional integration:

$$\det S \propto \left( \int_V \mathcal D \phi \; e^{- \langle \phi, S\phi\rangle} \right)^{-2} \,.$$

This path integral is only well defined up to some divergent multiplicative constant. To give it a rigorous meaning it must be divided by another functional determinant, thus effectively cancelling the problematic 'constants'.

These are now, ostensibly, two different definitions for the functional determinant, one coming from quantum field theory and one coming from spectral theory. Each involves some kind of regularization: in the definition popular in physics, two determinants can only be compared with one another; in mathematics, the zeta function was used. Osgood, Phillips & Sarnak (1988) have shown that the results obtained by comparing two functional determinants in the QFT formalism agree with the results obtained by the zeta functional determinant.

== Defining formulae ==
=== Path integral version ===
For a positive self-adjoint operator S on a finite-dimensional Euclidean space V, the formula

$$\frac{1}{\sqrt{\det S}} = \int_V e^{-\pi\langle x,Sx\rangle}\, dx$$

holds.

The problem is to find a way to make sense of the determinant of an operator S on an infinite dimensional function space. One approach, favored in quantum field theory, in which the function space consists of continuous paths on a closed interval, is to formally attempt to calculate the integral

$$\int_V e^{-\pi\langle \phi,S\phi\rangle}\, \mathcal D\phi$$

where V is the function space and $\langle \cdot,\cdot\rangle$ the L^{2} inner product, and $\mathcal D\phi$ the Wiener measure. The basic assumption on S is that it should be self-adjoint, and have discrete spectrum λ_{1}, λ_{2}, λ_{3}, ... with a corresponding set of eigenfunctions f_{1}, f_{2}, f_{3}, ... which are complete in L^{2} (as would, for example, be the case for the second derivative operator on a compact interval Ω). This roughly means all functions φ can be written as linear combinations of the functions f_{i}:

$$|\phi\rangle = \sum_i c_i |f_i\rangle \quad \text{with } c_i = \langle f_i | \phi \rangle.$$

Hence the inner product in the exponential can be written as

$$\langle\phi|S|\phi\rangle = \sum_{i,j} c_i^*c_j \langle f_i|S|f_j\rangle = \sum_{i,j}c_i^*c_j \delta_{ij}\lambda_i  = \sum_i |c_i|^2 \lambda_i.$$

In the basis of the functions f_{i}, the functional integration reduces to an integration over all basis functions. Formally, assuming our intuition from the finite dimensional case carries over into the infinite dimensional setting, the measure should then be equal to

$$\mathcal D \phi = \prod_i \frac{dc_i}{2\pi}.$$

This makes the functional integral a product of Gaussian integrals:

$$\int_V \mathcal D \phi \; e^{-\langle \phi|S|\phi\rangle} = \prod_i \int_{-\infty}^{+\infty} \frac{dc_i}{2\pi} e^{-\lambda_ic_i^2}.$$

The integrals can then be evaluated, giving

$$\int_V \mathcal D \phi \; e^{-\langle \phi|S|\phi\rangle} = \prod_i \frac1{2\sqrt{\pi\lambda_i}} = \frac N{\sqrt{\prod_i\lambda_i}}$$

where N is an infinite constant that needs to be dealt with by some regularization procedure. The product of all eigenvalues is equal to the determinant for finite-dimensional spaces, and we formally define this to be the case in our infinite-dimensional case also. This results in the formula

$$\int_V \mathcal D \phi \; e^{-\langle\phi|S|\phi\rangle} \propto \frac{1}{\sqrt{\det S}}.$$

If all quantities converge in an appropriate sense, then the functional determinant can be described as a classical limit (Watson and Whittaker). Otherwise, it is necessary to perform some kind of regularization. The most popular of which for computing functional determinants is the zeta function regularization. For instance, this allows for the computation of the determinant of the Laplace and Dirac operators on a Riemannian manifold, using the Minakshisundaram–Pleijel zeta function. Otherwise, it is also possible to consider the quotient of two determinants, making the divergent constants cancel.

=== Zeta function version ===
Let S be an elliptic differential operator with smooth coefficients which is positive on functions of compact support. That is, there exists a constant c > 0 such that

$$\langle\phi,S\phi\rangle \ge c\langle\phi,\phi\rangle$$

for all compactly supported smooth functions $\phi$. Then S has a self-adjoint extension to an operator on L^{2} with lower bound c. The eigenvalues of S can be arranged in a sequence

$$0<\lambda_1\le\lambda_2\le\cdots,\qquad\lambda_n\to\infty.$$

Then the zeta function of S is defined by the series:

$$\zeta_S(s) = \sum_{n=1}^\infty \frac{1}{\lambda_n^s}.$$

It is known that ζ_{S} has a meromorphic extension to the entire plane. Moreover, although one can define the zeta function in more general situations, the zeta function of an elliptic differential operator (or pseudodifferential operator) is regular at $s = 0$.

Formally, differentiating this series term-by-term gives

$$\zeta_S'(s) = \sum_{n=1}^\infty \frac{-\ln\lambda_n}{\lambda_n^s},$$

and so if the functional determinant is well-defined, then it should be given by

$$\det S = \exp\left(-\zeta_S'(0)\right).$$

Since the analytic continuation of the zeta function is regular at zero, this can be rigorously adopted as a definition of the determinant.

This kind of Zeta-regularized functional determinant also appears when evaluating sums of the form $\sum_{n=0}^{\infty} \frac{1}{(n+a)}$. Integration over a gives $\sum_{n=0}^{\infty}\ln(n+a)$ which can just be considered as the logarithm of the determinant for a Harmonic oscillator. This last value is just equal to $-\partial _s \zeta_H(0,a)$, where $\zeta_H(s,a)$ is the Hurwitz zeta function.

== Practical example ==
The infinite potential well with A = 0.

=== The infinite potential well ===
We will compute the determinant of the following operator describing the motion of a quantum mechanical particle in an infinite potential well:

$$\det \left(-\frac{d^2}{dx^2} + A\right) \qquad (x\in[0,L]),$$

where A is the depth of the potential and L is the length of the well. We will compute this determinant by diagonalizing the operator and multiplying the eigenvalues. So as not to have to bother with the uninteresting divergent constant, we will compute the quotient between the determinants of the operator with depth A and the operator with depth A = 0. The eigenvalues of this potential are equal to

$$\lambda_n = \frac{n^2\pi^2}{L^2} + A \qquad (n \in \mathbb N \setminus \{0\}).$$

This means that

$$\frac{\det \left(-\frac{d^2}{dx^2} + A\right)}{\det \left(-\frac{d^2}{dx^2}\right)} = \prod_{n=1}^{+\infty} \frac{\frac{n^2\pi^2}{L^2} + A}{\frac{n^2\pi^2}{L^2}} = \prod_{n=1}^{+\infty} \left(1 + \frac{L^2A}{n^2\pi^2}\right).$$

Now we can use Euler's infinite product representation for the sine function:

$$\sin z = z \prod_{n=1}^{\infty} \left(1 - \frac{z^2}{n^2\pi^2}\right)$$

from which a similar formula for the hyperbolic sine function can be derived:

$$\sinh z = - i\sin iz = z \prod_{n=1}^{\infty} \left(1 + \frac{z^2}{n^2\pi^2}\right).$$

Applying this, we find that

$$\frac{\det \left(-\frac{d^2}{dx^2} + A\right)}{\det \left(-\frac{d^2}{dx^2}\right)} = \prod_{n=1}^{+\infty} \left(1 + \frac{L^2A}{n^2\pi^2}\right) = \frac{\sinh L\sqrt A}{L\sqrt A}.$$

=== Another way for computing the functional determinant ===
For one-dimensional potentials, a short-cut yielding the functional determinant exists. It is based on consideration of the following expression:

$$\frac{\det \left(-\frac{d^2}{dx^2} + V_1(x) - m\right)}{\det \left(-\frac{d^2}{dx^2} + V_2(x) - m\right)}$$

where m is a complex constant. This expression is a meromorphic function of m, having zeros when m equals an eigenvalue of the operator with potential V_{1}(x) and a pole when m is an eigenvalue of the operator with potential V_{2}(x). We now consider the functions ψ^{m}_{1} and ψ^{m}_{2} with

$$\left(-\frac{d^2}{dx^2} + V_i(x) - m\right) \psi_i^m(x) = 0$$

obeying the boundary conditions

$$\psi_i^m(0) = 0, \quad\qquad \frac{d\psi_i^m}{dx}(0) = 1.$$

If we construct the function

$$\Delta(m) = \frac{\psi_1^m(L)}{\psi_2^m(L)},$$

which is also a meromorphic function of m, we see that it has exactly the same poles and zeroes as the quotient of determinants we are trying to compute: if m is an eigenvalue of the operator number one, then ψ^{m}_{1}(x) will be an eigenfunction thereof, meaning ψ^{m}_{1}(L) = 0; and analogously for the denominator. By Liouville's theorem, two meromorphic functions with the same zeros and poles must be proportional to one another. In our case, the proportionality constant turns out to be one, and we get

$$\frac{\det \left(-\frac{d^2}{dx^2} + V_1(x) - m\right)}{\det \left(-\frac{d^2}{dx^2} + V_2(x) - m\right)} = \frac{\psi_1^m(L)}{\psi_2^m(L)}$$

for all values of m. For m = 0 we get

$$\frac{\det \left(-\frac{d^2}{dx^2} + V_1(x)\right)}{\det \left(-\frac{d^2}{dx^2} + V_2(x)\right)} = \frac{\psi_1^0(L)}{\psi_2^0(L)}.$$

=== The infinite potential well revisited ===
The problem in the previous section can be solved more easily with this formalism. The functions ψ^{0}_{i}(x) obey

$$\begin{align} & \left(-\frac{d^2}{dx^2} + A\right) \psi_1^0 = 0,\qquad \psi_1^0(0) = 0 \quad,\qquad \frac{d\psi_1^0}{dx}(0) = 1, \\ & -\frac{d^2}{dx^2}\psi_2^0 = 0,\qquad \psi_2^0(0) = 0,\qquad \frac{d\psi_2^0}{dx}(0) = 1, \end{align}$$

yielding the following solutions:

$$\begin{align} & \psi_1^0(x) = \frac1{\sqrt A} \sinh x\sqrt A, \\ & \psi_2^0(x) = x. \end{align}$$

This gives the final expression

$$\frac{\det \left(-\frac{d^2}{dx^2} + A\right)}{\det \left(-\frac{d^2}{dx^2}\right)} = \frac{\sinh L\sqrt A}{L\sqrt A}.$$

== See also ==
- Abstract Wiener space
- Berezinian
- Fredholm determinant
- Fujikawa method
- Faddeev–Popov ghost
