= Large diffeomorphism =

Class of diffeomorphism

In mathematics and theoretical physics, a large diffeomorphism is an equivalence class of diffeomorphisms under the equivalence relation where diffeomorphisms that can be continuously connected to each other are in the same equivalence class.

For example, a two-dimensional real torus has a SL(2,Z) group of large diffeomorphisms by which the 1-cycles $a,b$ of the torus are transformed into their integer linear combinations. This group of large diffeomorphisms is called the modular group.

More generally, for a surface S, the structure of self-homeomorphisms up to homotopy is known as the mapping class group. It is known (for compact, orientable S) that this is isomorphic with the automorphism group of the fundamental group of S. This is consistent with the genus 1 case, stated above, if one takes into account that then the fundamental group is Z^{2}, on which the modular group acts as automorphisms (as a subgroup of index 2 in all automorphisms, since the orientation may also be reverse, by a transformation with determinant −1).

== See also ==
- Large gauge transformation
