= One-loop Feynman diagram =

Feynman diagram with only one cycle

In physics, a one-loop Feynman diagram is a connected Feynman diagram with only one cycle (unicyclic). Such a diagram can be obtained from a connected tree diagram by taking two external lines of the same type and joining them together into an edge.

Diagrams with loops (in graph theory, these kinds of loops are called cycles, while the word loop is an edge connecting a vertex with itself) correspond to the quantum corrections to the classical field theory. Because one-loop diagrams only contain one cycle, they express the next-to-classical contributions called the semiclassical contributions.

One-loop diagrams are usually computed as the integral over one independent momentum that can "run in the cycle". The Casimir effect, Hawking radiation and Lamb shift are examples of phenomena whose theoretical existence can be implied using one-loop Feynman diagrams, especially the well-known "triangle diagram":

The evaluation of one-loop Feynman diagrams usually leads to divergent expressions, which are either due to:

- zero-mass particles in the cycle of the diagram (infrared divergence) or
- insufficient falloff of the integrand for high momenta (ultraviolet divergence).

Infrared divergences are usually dealt with by assigning the zero mass particles a small mass λ, evaluating the corresponding expression and then taking the limit $\lambda \to 0$. Ultraviolet divergences are dealt with by renormalization.

== See also ==
- Tadpole (physics)
- Furry's theorem
