= QCD vacuum =

Lowest energy state in quantum chromodynamics

The QCD vacuum is the quantum vacuum state of quantum chromodynamics (QCD). It is an example of a non-perturbative vacuum state, characterized by non-vanishing condensates such as the gluon condensate and the quark condensate in the complete theory which includes quarks. The presence of these condensates characterizes the confined phase of quark matter.

Unsolved problem in physics
QCD in the non-perturbative regime: confinement. The equations of QCD remain unsolved at energy scales relevant for describing atomic nuclei. How does QCD give rise to the physics of nuclei and nuclear constituents?
More unsolved problems in physics

== Symmetries and symmetry breaking ==
=== Symmetries of the QCD Lagrangian ===
Like any relativistic quantum field theory, QCD enjoys Poincaré symmetry including the discrete symmetries CPT (each of which is realized). Apart from these space-time symmetries, it also has internal symmetries. Since QCD is an SU(3) gauge theory, it has local SU(3) gauge symmetry.

Since it has many flavours of quarks, it has approximate flavour and chiral symmetry. This approximation is said to involve the chiral limit of QCD. Of these chiral symmetries, the baryon number symmetry is exact. Some of the broken symmetries include the axial U(1) symmetry of the flavour group. This is broken by the chiral anomaly. The presence of instantons implied by this anomaly also breaks CP symmetry.

In summary, the QCD Lagrangian has the following symmetries:

- Poincaré symmetry and CPT invariance
- SU(3) local gauge symmetry
- approximate global SU(N_{f}) × SU(N_{f}) flavour chiral symmetry and the U(1) baryon number symmetry

The following classical symmetries are broken in the QCD Lagrangian:

- scale, i.e., conformal symmetry (through the scale anomaly), giving rise to asymptotic freedom
- the axial part of the U(1) flavour chiral symmetry (through the chiral anomaly), giving rise to the strong CP problem.

=== Spontaneous symmetry breaking ===
When the Hamiltonian of a system (or the Lagrangian) has a certain symmetry, but the vacuum does not, then one says that spontaneous symmetry breaking (SSB) has taken place.

A familiar example of SSB is in ferromagnetic materials. Microscopically, the material consists of atoms with a non-vanishing spin, each of which acts like a tiny bar magnet, i.e., a magnetic dipole. The Hamiltonian of the material, describing the interaction of neighbouring dipoles, is invariant under rotations. At high temperature, there is no magnetization of a large sample of the material. Then one says that the symmetry of the Hamiltonian is realized by the system. However, at low temperature, there could be an overall magnetization. This magnetization has a preferred direction, since one can tell the north magnetic pole of the sample from the south magnetic pole. In this case, there is spontaneous symmetry breaking of the rotational symmetry of the Hamiltonian.

When a continuous symmetry is spontaneously broken, massless bosons appear, corresponding to the remaining symmetry. This is called the Goldstone phenomenon and the bosons are called Goldstone bosons.

=== Symmetries of the QCD vacuum ===
The SU(N_{f}) × SU(N_{f}) chiral flavour symmetry of the QCD Lagrangian is broken in the vacuum state of the theory. The symmetry of the vacuum state is the diagonal SU(N_{f}) part of the chiral group. The diagnostic for this is the formation of a non-vanishing chiral condensate ⟨ψ̅_{i̅}ψ_{i}⟩, where ψ_{i} is the quark field operator, and the flavour index i is summed. The Goldstone bosons of the symmetry breaking are the pseudoscalar mesons.

When N_{f} = 2, i.e., only the up and down quarks are treated as massless, the three pions are the Goldstone bosons. When the strange quark is also treated as massless, i.e., N_{f} = 3, all eight pseudoscalar mesons of the quark model become Goldstone bosons. The actual masses of these mesons are obtained in chiral perturbation theory through an expansion in the (small) actual masses of the quarks.

In other phases of quark matter the full chiral flavour symmetry may be recovered, or broken in completely different ways.

== Experimental evidence ==
The evidence for QCD condensates comes from two eras, the pre-QCD era 1950–1973 and the post-QCD era, after 1974. The pre-QCD results established that the strong interactions vacuum contains a quark chiral condensate, while the post-QCD results established that the vacuum also contains a gluon condensate.

=== Motivating results ===
==== Gradient coupling ====
In the 1950s, there were many attempts to produce a field theory to describe the interactions of pions ($\pi$) and nucleons ($N$). The obvious renormalizable interaction between the two objects is the Yukawa coupling to a pseudoscalar boson:

$$L_I= \bar{N}\gamma_5 \pi N$$

And this is theoretically correct, since it is leading order and it takes all the symmetries into account. But it doesn't match experiment in isolation. When the nonrelativistic limit of this coupling is taken, the gradient-coupling model is obtained. To lowest order, the nonrelativistic pion field interacts by derivatives. This is not obvious in the relativistic form. A gradient interaction has a very different dependence on the energy of the pion—it vanishes at zero momentum.

This type of coupling means that a coherent state of low momentum pions barely interacts at all. This is a manifestation of an approximate symmetry, a shift symmetry of the pion field. The replacement

$$\pi \rightarrow \pi+C$$

leaves the gradient coupling alone, but not the pseudoscalar coupling, at least not by itself. The way nature fixes this in the pseudoscalar model is by simultaneous rotation of the proton-neutron and shift of the pion field. This, when the proper axial SU(2) symmetry is included, is the Gell-Mann Levy σ-model, discussed below.

The modern explanation for the shift symmetry is now understood to be the Nambu-Goldstone non-linear symmetry realization mode, due to Yoichiro Nambu and Jeffrey Goldstone. The pion field is a Goldstone boson, while the shift symmetry is a manifestation of a degenerate vacuum.

==== Goldberger–Treiman relation ====
There is a surprising relationship between the strong interaction coupling of the pions to the nucleons, the coefficient in the nucleon-pion-gradient coupling model, and the axial vector current coefficient of the nucleon, which determines the weak decay rate of the neutron. The relation is

$$g_{\pi NN} F_\pi = G_A M_N$$

and it is obeyed to 2.5% accuracy.

The constant G_{A} is the coefficient that determines the neutron decay rate: It gives the normalization of the weak interaction matrix elements for the nucleon. On the other hand, the pion-nucleon coupling is a phenomenological constant describing the (strong) scattering of bound states of quarks and gluons. The weak interactions are current-current interactions ultimately because they come from a non-Abelian gauge theory. The Goldberger–Treiman relation suggests that the pions, by dint of chiral symmetry breaking, interact as surrogates of sorts of the axial weak currents.

==== Partially conserved axial current ====
The structure which gives rise to the Goldberger–Treiman relation was called the partially conserved axial current (PCAC) hypothesis, spelled out in the pioneering σ-model paper. Partially conserved describes the modification of a spontaneously-broken symmetry current by an explicit breaking correction preventing its conservation. The axial current in question is also often called the chiral symmetry current.

The basic idea of SSB is that the symmetry current which performs axial rotations on the fundamental fields does not preserve the vacuum: This means that the current J applied to the vacuum produces particles. The particles must be spinless, otherwise the vacuum wouldn't be Lorentz invariant. By index matching, the matrix element must be

$$J_\mu |0\rangle = k_\mu |\pi\rangle \,,$$

where k_{μ} is the momentum carried by the created pion.

When the divergence of the axial current operator is zero, we must have

$$\partial_\mu J^\mu |0\rangle  = k^\mu k_\mu |\pi\rangle  = m_\pi^2|\pi\rangle = 0\,.$$

Hence these pions are massless, m^{2}_{π} = 0, in accordance with Goldstone's theorem.

If the scattering matrix element is considered, we have

$$k_\mu \langle N(p) |\pi(k)| N(p') \rangle  = \langle N(p) | J_\mu |N(p')\rangle \,.$$

Up to a momentum factor, which is the gradient in the coupling, it takes the same form as the axial current turning a neutron into a proton in the current-current form of the weak interaction.

$$\langle N |J^\mu |N\rangle  \langle e| J_\mu |\nu\rangle~.$$

But if a small explicit breaking of the chiral symmetry (due to quark masses) is introduced, as in real life, the above divergence does not vanish, and the right hand side involves the mass of the pion, now a Pseudo-Goldstone boson.

==== Soft pion emission ====
Extensions of the PCAC ideas allowed Steven Weinberg to calculate the amplitudes for collisions which emit low energy pions from the amplitude for the same process with no pions. The amplitudes are those given by acting with symmetry currents on the external particles of the collision.

These successes established the basic properties of the strong interaction vacuum well before QCD.

=== Pseudo-Goldstone bosons ===
Experimentally it is seen that the masses of the octet of pseudoscalar mesons is very much lighter than the next lightest states; i.e., the octet of vector mesons (such as the rho meson). The most convincing evidence for SSB of the chiral flavour symmetry of QCD is the appearance of these pseudo-Goldstone bosons. These would have been strictly massless in the chiral limit. There is convincing demonstration that the observed masses are compatible with chiral perturbation theory. The internal consistency of this argument is further checked by lattice QCD computations which allow one to vary the quark mass and check that the variation of the pseudoscalar masses with the quark mass is as required by chiral perturbation theory.

=== Eta prime meson ===
This pattern of SSB solves one of the earlier "mysteries" of the quark model, where all the pseudoscalar mesons should have been of nearly the same mass. Since N_{f} = 3, there should have been nine of these. However, one (the SU(3) singlet η′ meson) has quite a larger mass than the SU(3) octet. In the quark model, this has no natural explanation – a mystery named the η−η′ mass splitting (the η is one member of the octet, which should have been degenerate in mass with the η′).

In QCD, one realizes that the η′ is associated with the axial U_{A}(1) which is explicitly broken through the chiral anomaly, and thus its mass is not "protected" to be small, like that of the η. The η–η′ mass splitting can be explained through the 't Hooft instanton mechanism, whose 1/N realization is also known as Witten–Veneziano mechanism.

=== Current algebra and QCD sum rules ===
PCAC and current algebra also provide evidence for this pattern of SSB. Direct estimates of the chiral condensate also come from such analysis.

Another method of analysis of correlation functions in QCD is through an operator product expansion (OPE). This writes the vacuum expectation value of a non-local operator as a sum over VEVs of local operators, i.e., condensates. The value of the correlation function then dictates the values of the condensates. Analysis of many separate correlation functions gives consistent results for several condensates, including the gluon condensate, the quark condensate, and many mixed and higher order condensates. In particular one obtains

$$\begin{align}
\left\langle (gG)^2\right\rangle\ \stackrel{\mathrm{def}}{=}\  \left\langle g^2 G_{\mu\nu}G^{\mu\nu}\right\rangle &\approx 0.5 \;\text{GeV}^4 \\
\left\langle \overline\psi\psi\right\rangle &\approx (-0.23)^3 \;\text{GeV}^3 \\
\left\langle (gG)^4\right\rangle&\approx 5:10\left\langle (gG)^2\right\rangle^2
\end{align}$$

Here G refers to the gluon field tensor, ψ to the quark field, and g to the QCD coupling.

These analyses are being refined further through improved sum rule estimates and direct estimates in lattice QCD. They provide the raw data which must be explained by models of the QCD vacuum.

== Models ==
A full solution of QCD should give a full description of the vacuum, confinement and the hadron spectrum. Lattice QCD is making rapid progress towards providing the solution as a systematically improvable numerical computation. However, approximate models of the QCD vacuum remain useful in more restricted domains. The purpose of these models is to make quantitative sense of some set of condensates and hadron properties such as masses and form factors.

This section is devoted to models. Opposed to these are systematically improvable computational procedures such as large N QCD and lattice QCD, which are described in their own articles.

=== Savvidy vacuum, instabilities and structure ===
The Savvidy vacuum is a model of the QCD vacuum which at a basic level is a statement that it cannot be the conventional Fock vacuum empty of particles and fields. In 1977, George Savvidy showed that the QCD vacuum with zero field strength is unstable, and decays into a state with a calculable non vanishing value of the field. Since condensates are scalar, it seems like a good first approximation that the vacuum contains some non-zero but homogeneous field which gives rise to these condensates. However, Stanley Mandelstam showed that a homogeneous vacuum field is also unstable. The instability of a homogeneous gluon field was argued by Niels Kjær Nielsen and Poul Olesen in their 1978 paper. These arguments suggest that the scalar condensates are an effective long-distance description of the vacuum, and at short distances, below the QCD scale, the vacuum may have structure.

=== The dual superconducting model ===
In a type II superconductor, electric charges condense into Cooper pairs. As a result, magnetic flux is squeezed into tubes. In the dual superconductor picture of the QCD vacuum, chromomagnetic monopoles condense into dual Cooper pairs, causing chromoelectric flux to be squeezed into tubes. As a result, confinement and the string picture of hadrons follows. This dual superconductor picture is due to Gerard 't Hooft and Stanley Mandelstam. 't Hooft showed further that an Abelian projection of a non-Abelian gauge theory contains magnetic monopoles.

While the vortices in a type II superconductor are neatly arranged into a hexagonal or occasionally square lattice, as is reviewed in Olesen's 1980 seminar one may expect a much more complicated and possibly dynamical structure in QCD. For example, nonabelian Abrikosov-Nielsen-Olesen vortices may vibrate wildly or be knotted.

=== String models ===
String models of confinement and hadrons have a long history. They were first invented to explain certain aspects of crossing symmetry in the scattering of two mesons. They were also found to be useful in the description of certain properties of the Regge trajectory of the hadrons. These early developments took on a life of their own called the dual resonance model (later renamed string theory). However, even after the development of QCD string models continued to play a role in the physics of strong interactions. These models are called non-fundamental strings or QCD strings, since they should be derived from QCD, as they are, in certain approximations such as the strong coupling limit of lattice QCD.

The model states that the colour electric flux between a quark and an antiquark collapses into a string, rather than spreading out into a Coulomb field as the normal electric flux does. This string also obeys a different force law. It behaves as if the string had constant tension, so that separating out the ends (quarks) would give a potential energy increasing linearly with the separation. When the energy is higher than that of a meson, the string breaks and the two new ends become a quark-antiquark pair, thus describing the creation of a meson. Thus confinement is incorporated naturally into the model.

In the form of the Lund model Monte Carlo program, this picture has had remarkable success in explaining experimental data collected in electron-electron and hadron-hadron collisions.

=== Bag models ===
Strictly, these models are not models of the QCD vacuum, but of physical single particle quantum states — the hadrons. The model proposed originally in 1974 by A. Chodos et al. consists of inserting a quark model in a perturbative vacuum inside a volume of space called a bag. Outside this bag is the real QCD vacuum, whose effect is taken into account through the difference between energy density of the true QCD vacuum and the perturbative vacuum (bag constant B) and boundary conditions imposed on the quark wave functions and the gluon field. The hadron spectrum is obtained by solving the Dirac equation for quarks and the Yang–Mills equations for gluons. The wave functions of the quarks satisfy the boundary conditions of a fermion in an infinitely deep potential well of scalar type with respect to the Lorentz group. The boundary conditions for the gluon field are those of the dual color superconductor. The role of such a superconductor is attributed to the physical vacuum of QCD. Bag models strictly prohibit the existence of open color (free quarks, free gluons, etc.) and lead in particular to string models of hadrons.

The chiral bag model couples the axial vector current ψ̅γ_{5}γ_{μ}ψ of the quarks at the bag boundary to a pionic field outside of the bag. In the most common formulation, the chiral bag model basically replaces the interior of the skyrmion with the bag of quarks. Very curiously, most physical properties of the nucleon become mostly insensitive to the bag radius. Prototypically, the baryon number of the chiral bag remains an integer, independent of bag radius: the exterior baryon number is identified with the topological winding number density of the Skyrme soliton, while the interior baryon number consists of the valence quarks (totaling to one) plus the spectral asymmetry of the quark eigenstates in the bag. The spectral asymmetry is just the vacuum expectation value ⟨ψ̅γ_{0}ψ⟩ summed over all of the quark eigenstates in the bag. Other values, such as the total mass and the axial coupling constant g_{A}, are not precisely invariant like the baryon number, but are mostly insensitive to the bag radius, as long as the bag radius is kept below the nucleon diameter. Because the quarks are treated as free quarks inside the bag, the radius-independence in a sense validates the idea of asymptotic freedom.

=== Instanton ensemble ===
Another view states that BPST-like instantons play an important role in the vacuum structure of QCD. These instantons were discovered in 1975 by Alexander Belavin, Alexander Markovich Polyakov, Albert S. Schwarz and Yu. S. Tyupkin as topologically stable solutions to the Yang-Mills field equations. They represent tunneling transitions from one vacuum state to another. These instantons are indeed found in lattice calculations. The first computations performed with instantons used the dilute gas approximation. The results obtained did not solve the infrared problem of QCD, making many physicists turn away from instanton physics. Later, though, an instanton liquid model was proposed, turning out to be more promising an approach.

The dilute instanton gas model departs from the supposition that the QCD vacuum consists of a gas of BPST-like instantons. Although only the solutions with one or few instantons (or anti-instantons) are known exactly, a dilute gas of instantons and anti-instantons can be approximated by considering a superposition of one-instanton solutions at great distances from one another. Gerard 't Hooft calculated the effective action for such an ensemble, and he found an infrared divergence for big instantons, meaning that an infinite amount of infinitely big instantons would populate the vacuum.

Later, an instanton liquid model was studied. This model starts from the assumption that an ensemble of instantons cannot be described by a mere sum of separate instantons. Various models have been proposed, introducing interactions between instantons or using variational methods (like the "valley approximation") endeavoring to approximate the exact multi-instanton solution as closely as possible. Many phenomenological successes have been reached. Whether an instanton liquid can explain confinement in 3+1 dimensional QCD is not known, but many physicists think that it is unlikely.

=== Center vortex picture ===
A more recent picture of the QCD vacuum is one in which center vortices play an important role. These vortices are topological defects carrying a center element as charge. These vortices are usually studied using lattice simulations, and it has been found that the behavior of the vortices is closely linked with the confinement–deconfinement phase transition: in the confinement phase vortices percolate and fill the spacetime volume, in the deconfinement phase they are much suppressed. Also it has been shown that the string tension vanished upon removal of center vortices from the simulations, hinting at an important role for center vortices.

== See also ==
- Vacuum state and vacuum
  - QED vacuum of quantum electrodynamics
- Flavour (particle physics)
- Top quark condensate
- Goldstone boson
- Higgs mechanism

== Bibliography ==
- Watson, Andrew (2004-10-07). The Quantum Quark. ISBN 978-0-521-82907-6.
- Shifman, M. A. (2001). Handbook of QCD. World Scientific. ISBN 978-981-238-028-9.
- Shuryak, E. V. (2004). The QCD Vacuum, Hadrons and Superdense Matter. World Scientific. ISBN 978-981-238-574-1.
