= Caloron =

Finite temperature instanton

In mathematical physics, a caloron is the finite temperature generalization of an instanton.

== Finite temperature and instantons ==
At zero temperature, instantons are the name given to solutions of the classical equations of motion of the Euclidean version of the theory under consideration, and which are furthermore localized in Euclidean spacetime. They describe tunneling between different topological vacuum states of the Minkowski theory. One important example of an instanton is the BPST instanton, discovered in 1975 by Alexander Belavin, Alexander Markovich Polyakov, Albert Schwartz and Yu S. Tyupkin. This is a topologically stable solution to the four-dimensional SU(2) Yang–Mills field equations in Euclidean spacetime (i.e. after Wick rotation).

Finite temperatures in quantum field theories are modeled by compactifying the imaginary (Euclidean) time (see thermal quantum field theory). This changes the overall structure of spacetime, and thus also changes the form of the instanton solutions. According to the Matsubara formalism, at finite temperature, the Euclidean time dimension is periodic, which means that instanton solutions have to be periodic as well.

== In SU(2) Yang–Mills theory ==
In SU(2) Yang–Mills theory at zero temperature, the instantons have the form of the BPST instanton. The generalization thereof to finite temperature has been found by Harrington and Shepard:

$$A_\mu^a(x) = \bar\eta_{\mu\nu}^a \Pi(x) \partial_\nu \Pi^{-1}(x) \quad\text{with} \quad \Pi(x) = 1+\frac{\pi\rho^2T}r \frac{\sinh(2\pi rT)}{\cosh(2\pi rT)-\cos(2\pi \tau T)} \ ,$$

where $\bar\eta_{\mu\nu}^a$ is the anti-'t Hooft symbol, r is the distance from the point x to the center of the caloron, ρ is the size of the caloron, $\tau$ is the Euclidean time and T is the temperature. This solution was found based on a periodic multi-instanton solution first suggested by Gerard 't Hooft and published by Edward Witten.

== Bibliography ==
- Das, Ashok (1997). Finite Temperature Field Theory. World Scientific. ISBN 981-02-2856-2.
- Shifman (1994). Instantons in Gauge Theory. World Scientific. ISBN 981-02-1681-5.
- Dmitri Diakonov; Nikolay Gromov (2005). "SU(N) caloron measure and its relation to instantons". Physical Review D. 72 (2) 025003. arXiv:hep-th/0502132. Bibcode:2005PhRvD..72b5003D. doi:10.1103/PhysRevD.72.025003. S2CID 119496217.
- Daniel Nogradi (2005). "Multi-calorons and their moduli". arXiv:hep-th/0511125.
- Shnir (2006). "Self-dual and non-self dual axially symmetric caloron solutions in SU(2) Yang-Mills theory". arXiv:hep-th/0609019.
- Philipp Gerhold; Ernst-Michael Ilgenfritz; Michael Müller-Preussker (2007). "Improved superposition schemes for approximate multi-caloron configurations". Nuclear Physics B. 774 (1–3): 268–297. arXiv:hep-ph/0610426. Bibcode:2007NuPhB.774..268G. doi:10.1016/j.nuclphysb.2007.04.003. S2CID 119471511.
