= Hooft =

Hooft, 't Hooft etc. are different Dutch surnames. There are topographic or toponymic surnames related to the location named Hooft meaning "(the) head" (hoofd in modern Dutch) and 't, van der, etc. are tussenvoegsels (surname affixes). Notable people with the surnames include:

Tussenvoegsels are ignored in surname sorting.

- Anna Van Hooft (born 1980s), Canadian actress
- Cornelis Hooft (1547–1627), Dutch statesman, father of P.C. Hooft
- Catharina Hooft (1618–1691), woman of the Dutch Golden Age
- Elroy van der Hooft (born 1990), Dutch football forward
- Francis van 't Hooft (born 1940), Dutch field hockey player
- Gerard 't Hooft (born 1946), Dutch theoretical physicist and Nobel Laureate
- Haas Visser 't Hooft (1905–1977), Dutch field hockey player
- Hans van Hooft Sr. (1941–2026), Dutch politician
- Hendrik Daniëlsz Hooft (1716–1794), Dutch politician during the Patriottentijd
- Henrick Hooft (1617–1678), Dutch mayor of Amsterdam,
- Henri Hooft (born 1969), Dutch kickboxer and trainer
- Ina Hooft (1894–1994), Dutch artist full name: Gerardina Anna Allegonda Martina Hooft
- Jenny Visser-Hooft born Jeannette Hooft (1888–1939), Dutch traveler, mountaineer, and writer
- Jotie T'Hooft (1956–1977), Flemish Belgian neo-romantic poet
- Martha Visser't Hooft, American painter and teacher
- Pieter Corneliszoon Hooft (1581–1647), Dutch historian, poet and playwright
- Willem Visser 't Hooft (1900–1985), Dutch theologian and the first secretary general of the World Council of Churches

== See also ==
Named after Pieter Corneliszoon Hooft

- Hooft (island), artificial islet in the IJmeer
- P. C. Hooft Award, Dutch language literary lifetime achievement award
- MV Pieter Corneliszoon Hooft, Dutch ocean liner built in 1925

Named after Gerard 't Hooft

- 9491 Thooft (without an apostrophe), a main-belt asteroid
- Quantum field theory terminology:
  - 't Hooft matching condition
  - 't Hooft loop
  - 't Hooft symbol
  - 't Hooft–Polyakov monopole
