= Condensate =

Condensate may refer to:

- The liquid phase produced by the condensation of steam or any other gas
- The product of a chemical condensation reaction, other than water
- Natural-gas condensate, in the natural gas industry
- Condensate (album), a 2011 album by The Original 7ven, the band formerly known as The Time

== Quantum physics ==
- Canonical quantization or vacuum expectation value, in quantum field theory
- Bose–Einstein condensate, a substance which occurs at very low temperatures in a system of bosons
- Fermionic condensate, a substance which occurs at very low temperatures in a system of fermions
- Gluon condensate, a non-perturbative property of the QCD vacuum

=== Theoretical states ===
- Color-glass condensate, an extreme type of matter theorized to exist in atomic nuclei traveling near the speed of light
- Top quark condensate, an alternative theory to the Standard Model

== See also ==
- Biomolecular condensate
