= BPST instanton =

Type of Yang–Mills instanton

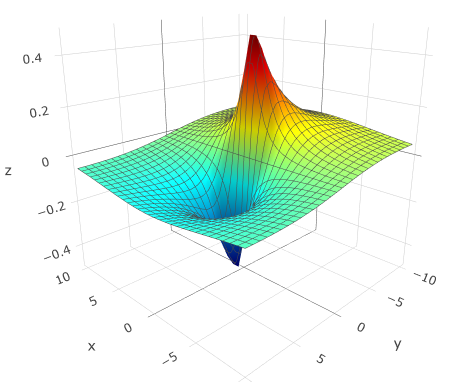
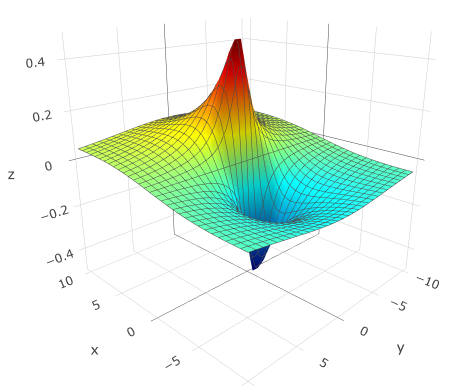
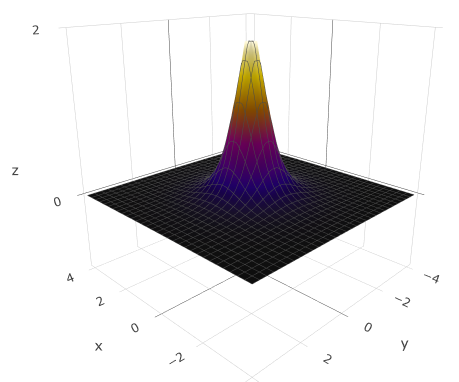
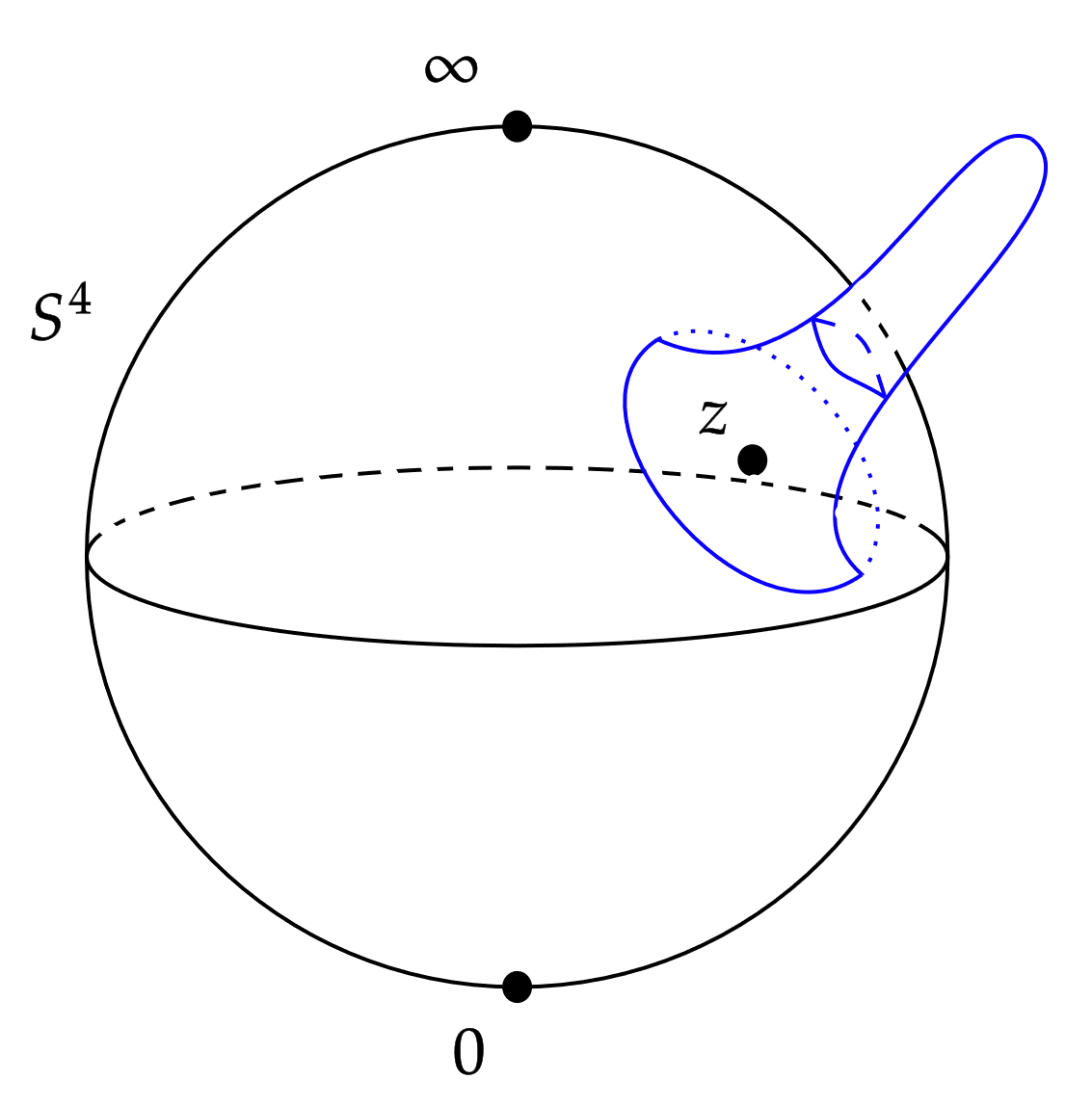
The dx^{1}⊗σ_{3} coefficient of BPST instanton on the (x^{1},x^{2})-slice of R^{4} where σ_{3} is the third Pauli matrix (top left). The dx^{2}⊗σ_{3} coefficient (top right). These coefficients A_{1}^{3} and A_{2}^{3} determine the restriction of the BPST instanton A with g=2,ρ=1,z=0 to this slice. The corresponding field strength centered around z=0 (bottom left). A visual representation of the field strength of a BPST instanton with center z on the compactification S^{4} of R^{4} (bottom right).

In theoretical physics, the Belavin–Polyakov–Schwarz–Tyupkin (BPST) instanton is the instanton with winding number 1 found by Alexander Belavin, Alexander Polyakov, Albert Schwarz and Yu. S. Tyupkin in 1975. It is a classical solution to the equations of motion of SU(2) Yang–Mills theory in Euclidean space-time (i.e. after Wick rotation), meaning it describes a transition between two different topological vacua of the theory. It was originally hoped to open the path to solving the problem of confinement, especially since Polyakov had proven in 1975 that instantons are the cause of confinement in three-dimensional compact-QED. This hope was not realized, however.

== Description ==
=== Instanton ===
The BPST instanton has a nontrivial winding number, which can be visualised as a non-trivial mapping of the circle on itself.

The BPST instanton is an essentially non-perturbative classical solution of the Yang–Mills field equations. It is found when minimizing the Yang–Mills SU(2) Lagrangian density:

$$\mathcal L = -\frac14F_{\mu\nu}^a F_{\mu\nu}^a$$

with F_{μν}^{a} = ∂_{μ}A_{ν}^{a} – ∂_{ν}A_{μ}^{a} + gε^{abc}A_{μ}^{b}A_{ν}^{c} the field strength. The instanton is a solution with finite action, so that F_{μν} must go to zero at space-time infinity, meaning that A_{μ} goes to a pure gauge configuration. Space-time infinity of our four-dimensional world is S^{3}. The gauge group SU(2) has exactly the same structure, so the solutions with A_{μ} pure gauge at infinity are mappings from S^{3} onto itself. These mappings can be labelled by an integer number q, the Pontryagin index (or winding number). Instantons have q = 1 and thus correspond (at infinity) to gauge transformations which cannot be continuously deformed to unity. The BPST solution is thus topologically stable.

It can be shown that self-dual configurations obeying the relation F_{μν}^{a} = ± 1/2 ε^{μναβ} F_{αβ}^{a} minimize the action. Solutions with a plus sign are called instantons, those with the minus sign are anti-instantons.

Instantons and anti-instantons can be shown to minimise the action locally as follows:

$\tilde{F}_{\mu\nu}\tilde{F}^{\mu\nu} = F_{\mu\nu}F^{\mu\nu}$, where $\tilde{F}_{\mu\nu} = \frac{1}{2}\epsilon_{\mu\nu}^{\rho\sigma}F_{\rho\sigma}$.
$$S = \int dx^4 \frac{1}{4}F^2 = \int dx^4 \frac{1}{8}(F\pm\tilde{F})^2 \mp \int dx^4 \frac{1}{4}F\tilde{F}$$

The first term is minimised by self-dual or anti-self-dual configurations, whereas the last term is a total derivative and therefore depends only on the boundary (i.e. $x\rightarrow\infty$) of the solution; it is therefore a topological invariant and can be shown to be an integer number times some constant (the constant here is $\frac {8\pi^2}{g^2}$). The integer is called instanton number (see Homotopy group).

Explicitly the instanton solution is given by

$$A_\mu^a (x) = \frac2g \frac{\eta^a_{\mu\nu} (x-z)_\nu}{(x-z)^2+\rho^2}$$

with z_{μ} the center and ρ the scale of the instanton. η^{a}_{μν} is the 't Hooft symbol:

$$\eta^a_{\mu\nu} = \begin{cases} \epsilon^{a\mu\nu} & \mu,\nu=1,2,3 \\ -\delta^{a\nu} & \mu=4 \\ \delta^{a\mu} & \nu=4 \\ 0 & \mu=\nu=4 \end{cases} .$$

For large x^{2}, ρ becomes negligible and the gauge field approaches that of the pure gauge transformation: $\frac {x^0 + i\mathbf{x}\cdot\mathbf{\sigma}}{\sqrt{x^2}}$. Indeed, the field strength is:

$$\frac{1}{2} \epsilon_{ijk}{F^a}_{jk} = {F^a}_{0i} = \frac{4{\rho}^2\delta_{ai}}{g(x^2+\rho^2)^2}$$

and approaches zero as fast as r^{−4} at infinity.

An anti-instanton is described by a similar expression, but with the 't Hooft symbol replaced by the anti-'t Hooft symbol $\bar\eta^a_{\mu\nu}$, which is equal to the ordinary 't Hooft symbol, except that the components with one of the Lorentz indices equal to four have opposite sign.

The BPST solution has many symmetries. Translations and dilations transform a solution into other solutions. Coordinate inversion (x^{μ} → x^{μ}/x^{2}) transforms an instanton of size ρ into an anti-instanton with size 1/ρ and vice versa. Rotations in Euclidean four-space and special conformal transformations leave the solution invariant (up to a gauge transformation).

The classical action of an instanton equals

$$S = \frac{8\pi^2}{g^2} .$$

Since this quantity comes in an exponential in the path integral formalism this is an essentially non-perturbative effect, as the function e^{−1/x^2} has vanishing Taylor series at the origin, despite being nonzero elsewhere.

=== Other gauges ===
The expression for the BPST instanton given above is in the so-called regular Landau gauge. Another form exists, which is gauge-equivalent with the expression given above, in the singular Landau gauge. In both these gauges, the expression satisfies ∂_{μ}A^{μ} = 0. In singular gauge the instanton is

$$A_\mu^a (x) = \frac2g \frac{\rho^2}{(x-z)^2} \frac{\bar\eta^a_{\mu\nu} (x-z)_\nu}{(x-z)^2+\rho^2} .$$

In singular gauge, the expression has a singularity in the center of the instanton, but goes to zero more swiftly for x to infinity.

When working in other gauges than the Landau gauge, similar expressions can be found in the literature.

== Generalization and embedding in other theories ==
At finite temperature the BPST instanton generalizes to what is called a caloron.

The above is valid for a Yang–Mills theory with SU(2) as gauge group. It can readily be generalized to an arbitrary non-Abelian group. The instantons are then given by the BPST instanton for some directions in the group space, and by zero in the other directions.

When turning to a Yang–Mills theory with spontaneous symmetry breaking due to the Higgs mechanism, one finds that BPST instantons are not exact solutions to the field equations anymore. In order to find approximate solutions, the formalism of constrained instantons can be used.

== Instanton gas and liquid ==
=== In QCD ===
It is expected that BPST-like instantons play an important role in the vacuum structure of QCD. Instantons are indeed found in lattice calculations. The first computations performed with instantons used the dilute gas approximation. The results obtained did not solve the infrared problem of QCD, making many physicists turn away from instanton physics. Later, though, an instanton liquid model was proposed, turning out to be a more promising approach.

The dilute instanton gas model departs from the supposition that the QCD vacuum consists of a gas of BPST instantons. Although only the solutions with one or few instantons (or anti-instantons) are known exactly, a dilute gas of instantons and anti-instantons can be approximated by considering a superposition of one-instanton solutions at great distances from one another. 't Hooft calculated the effective action for such an ensemble, and he found an infrared divergence for big instantons, meaning that an infinite amount of infinitely big instantons would populate the vacuum.

Later, an instanton liquid model was studied. This model starts from the assumption that an ensemble of instantons cannot be described by a mere sum of separate instantons. Various models have been proposed, introducing interactions between instantons or using variational methods (like the "valley approximation") endeavouring to approximate the exact multi-instanton solution as closely as possible. Many phenomenological successes have been reached. Confinement seems to be the biggest issue in Yang–Mills theory for which instantons have no answer whatsoever.

=== In electroweak theory ===
The weak interaction is described by SU(2), so that instantons can be expected to play a role there as well. If so, they would induce baryon number violation. Due to the Higgs mechanism, instantons are not exact solutions anymore, but approximations can be used instead. One of the conclusions is that the presence of a gauge boson mass suppresses large instantons, so that the instanton gas approximation is consistent.

Due to the non-perturbative nature of instantons, all their effects are suppressed by a factor of e^{−16π^{2}/g^{2}}, which, in electroweak theory, is of the order 10^{−179}.

== Other solutions to the field equations ==
The instanton and anti-instantons are not the only solutions of the Wick-rotated Yang–Mills field equations. Multi-instanton solutions have been found for q equal to two and three, and partial solutions exist for higher q as well. General multi-instanton solutions can only be approximated using the valley approximation — one starts from a certain ansatz (usually the sum of the required number of instantons) and one minimizes numerically the action under a given constraint (keeping the number of instantons and the sizes of the instantons constant).

Solutions which are not self-dual also exist. These are not local minima of the action, but instead they correspond to saddle points.

Instantons are also closely related to merons, singular non-dual solutions of the Euclidean Yang–Mills field equations of topological charge 1/2. Instantons are thought to be composed of two merons.

== See also ==
- Instanton
- Meron
- Wu–Yang monopole
