= Slavnov =

Slavnov (Russian: Славно́в) is a Russian surname. Notable people with the surname include:

- Andrei Slavnov (1939–2022), Russian theoretical physicist
- Sergei Slavnov (born 1982), Russian pair skater
- Roman Slavnov (born 1982), Russian footballer

== See also ==
- Slavnov-Taylor identities
