= Index of physics articles (!$@) =

The index of physics articles is split into multiple pages due to its size.

To navigate by individual letter use the table of contents below.

== !$@ ==
- 't Hooft loop
- 't Hooft symbol
- 't Hooft–Polyakov monopole
- (2+1)-dimensional topological gravity
- (n-p) reaction
- (−1)F
- ΔT
