= Scissors Modes =

Collective excitations

Scissors Modes are collective excitations in which two particle systems move with respect to each other conserving their shape. For the first time they were predicted to occur in deformed atomic nuclei by N. LoIudice and F. Palumbo, who used a semiclassical Two Rotor Model, whose solution required a realization of the O(4) algebra that was not known in mathematics. In this model protons and neutrons were assumed to form two interacting rotors to be identified with the blades of scissors. Their relative motion (Fig.1) generates a magnetic dipole moment whose coupling with the electromagnetic field provides the signature of the mode.

Scissors Mode in atomic nuclei: the proton (p) and neutron (n) rotors precess around their bisector.

Such states have been experimentally observed for the first time by A. Richter and collaborators in a rare earth nucleus, ^{156}Gd, and then systematically investigated experimentally and theoretically in all deformed atomic nuclei.

Inspired by this, D. Guéry-Odelin and S. Stringari predicted similar collective excitations in Bose-Einstein condensates in magnetic traps. In this case one of the blades of the scissors must be identified with the moving cloud of atoms and the other one with the trap. Also this excitation mode was experimentally confirmed.

In close analogy similar collective excitations have predicted in a number of other systems, including metal clusters, quantum dots, Fermi condensates and crystals, but none of them has yet been experimentally investigated or found.
