= Einstein–Cartan–Evans theory =

Discredited unified theory of physics

Einstein–Cartan–Evans theory or ECE theory was an attempted unified theory of physics proposed by the Welsh chemist and physicist Myron Wyn Evans (May 26, 1950 – May 2, 2019), which claimed to unify general relativity, quantum mechanics and electromagnetism. The hypothesis was largely published in the journal Foundations of Physics Letters between 2003 and 2005. Several of Evans's central claims were later shown to be mathematically incorrect and, in 2008, the new editor of Foundations of Physics, Nobel laureate Gerard 't Hooft, published an editorial note effectively retracting the journal's support for the hypothesis.

== Scope ==
Earlier versions of the theory were called "O(3) electrodynamics". Evans claims that he is able to derive a generally covariant field equation for electromagnetism and gravity, similar to that derived by Mendel Sachs.

Evans argues that Einstein's theory of general relativity does not take into account torsion, which is included in the Einstein–Cartan theory.

In 1998 Evans founded the Alpha Institute for Advanced Studies (AIAS) to keep developing his theory. Its website collects papers on the theory and recent developments.

The theory has been used to justify the motionless electromagnetic generator, a perpetual motion machine. In July 2017, Evans claimed (on his blog): "There is immediate international interest in [papers] UFT382 and UFT383, describing the new energy from spacetime (ES) circuits. There is also great interest in UFT364, the paper that describes the circuit [...] These circuits should be [...] developed into power stations." In November 2017, Evans expanded on this point as follows (again on his blog): "There is no reasonable doubt that the vacuum (or aether or spacetime) contains a source of inexhaustible, safe and clean energy. This source can be used in patented and replicated circuits such as those of [Evans's self-published papers] UFT311, UFT364, UFT382, and UFT383."

== Reception ==
Evans's claims are not accepted by the mainstream physics community. In an editorial note in Foundations of Physics the Nobel laureate Gerard 't Hooft discussed the "revolutionary paradigm switch in theoretical physics" promised by ECE theory. He concluded that activities in the subject "have remained limited to personal web pages and are absent from the standard electronic archives, while no reference to ECE theory can be spotted in any of the peer reviewed scientific journals".

Several of the published contributions in this theory have been shown to be mathematically incorrect. In response to these demonstrations, 't Hooft's editorial note concludes, "Taking into account the findings of Bruhn, Hehl and Obukhhov, the discussion of ECE theory in the journal Foundations of Physics will be concluded herewith unless very good arguments are presented to resume the matter."

== See also ==
- List of topics characterized as pseudoscience
