= Foundations of Physics =

- Discipline: Physics
- Language: English
- Edited by: Carlo Rovelli

Publication details
- History: 1970–present
- Publisher: Springer
- Frequency: Monthly
- Impact factor: 1.276 (2021)

Standard abbreviations
- ISO 4: Found. Phys.

Indexing
- ISSN: 0015-9018 (print); 1572-9516 (web)
- OCLC no.: 1569928

Links
- Journal homepage

Foundations of Physics is a monthly journal "devoted to the conceptual bases and fundamental theories of modern physics and cosmology, emphasizing the logical, methodological, and philosophical premises of modern physical theories and procedures". The journal publishes results and observations based on fundamental questions from all fields of physics, including: quantum mechanics, quantum field theory, special relativity, general relativity, string theory, M-theory, cosmology, thermodynamics, statistical physics, and quantum gravity

Foundations of Physics has been published since 1970. Its founding editors were Henry Margenau and Wolfgang Yourgrau. The 1999 Nobel laureate Gerard 't Hooft was editor-in-chief from January 2007. At that stage, it absorbed the associated journal for shorter submissions Foundations of Physics Letters, which had been edited by Alwyn Van der Merwe since its foundation in 1988. Past editorial board members (which include several Nobel laureates) include Louis de Broglie, Robert H. Dicke, Murray Gell-Mann, Abdus Salam, Ilya Prigogine and Nathan Rosen. Carlo Rovelli was announced as new editor-in-chief in February 2016.

== Einstein–Cartan–Evans theory ==
Between 2003 and 2005, Foundations of Physics Letters published a series of papers by Myron W. Evans claiming to make obsolete well-established results of quantum field theory and general relativity. In 2008, an editorial was written by the new Editor-in-Chief Gerard 't Hooft distancing the journal from the topic of Einstein–Cartan–Evans theory.

== Abstracting and indexing ==
According to the Journal Citation Reports, the journal has a 2021 impact factor of 1.276. The journal is abstracted and indexed in the following databases:

- Academic OneFile
- Academic Search
- Astrophysics Data System
- Current Abstracts
- Current Contents/Physical
- Chemical and Earth Sciences
- Digital Mathematics Registry
- EBSCO
- Expanded Academic
- Google Scholar
- H. W. Wilson
- INIS Atomindex
- Inspec
- INSPIRE-HEP
- International Bibliography of Book Reviews
- International Bibliography of Periodical Literature
- ISIS Current Bibliography of the History of Science
- Journal Citation Reports/Science Edition
- Mathematical Reviews
- OmniFile
- Science Citation Index
- Science Select
- Scopus
- Simbad Astronomical Database
- Summon by Serial Solutions
- Zentralblatt MATH
