= Douglas Ross (physicist) =

British physicist

Douglas Ross FRS
- Born: Douglas Alan Ross; 9 May 1948 (age 78)
- Education: University of Oxford (BA, DPhil)
- Awards: Fellow of the Royal Society (2005)
- Scientific career
- Fields: Quantum chromodynamics; Physics beyond the Standard Model
- Workplaces: CERN; University of Southampton
- Thesis: Higher order corrections in muon decay (1972)
- Doctoral advisor: John Clayton Taylor
- Website: southampton.ac.uk/~doug

Douglas Alan Ross FRS (born 9 May 1948) is a British physicist. As of 2017 he is Professor Emeritus of physics at the University of Southampton.

== Education ==
Ross was educated at New College, Oxford where he earned his Bachelor of Arts degree in 1969 and a Doctor of Philosophy in 1972, supervised by John Clayton Taylor for research on muon decay.

== Research ==
Ross is known for his contributions to the development and exploitation of gauge theories, both within and beyond the Standard Model of particle physics. His work has led to the understanding of the renormalisation structure of spontaneously broken theories and to the theoretical properties of the perturbation series in non-Abelian theories. He performed a number of the early perturbative calculations which helped establish quantum chromodynamics as the theory of the strong nuclear force. Among his contributions to physics beyond the Standard Model was the demonstration that the non-observation of proton decay excluded the simplest Grand Unified Theory.

=== Awards and honours ===
Ross was elected a Fellow of the Royal Society (FRS) in 2005.
