= Dual superconductor model =

Attempted model to explain color confinement

In the theory of quantum chromodynamics, dual superconductor models attempt to explain confinement of quarks in terms of an electromagnetic dual theory of superconductivity.

== Overview ==
In an electromagnetic dual theory the roles of electric and magnetic fields are interchanged. The BCS theory of superconductivity explains superconductivity as the result of the condensation of electric charges to Cooper pairs. In a dual superconductor an analogous effect occurs through the condensation of magnetic charges (also called magnetic monopoles). In ordinary electromagnetic theory, no monopoles have been shown to exist. However, in quantum chromodynamics — the theory of color charge which explains the strong interaction between quarks — the color charges can be viewed as (non-abelian) analogues of electric charges and corresponding magnetic monopoles are known to exist. Dual superconductor models posit that condensation of these magnetic monopoles in a superconductive state explains color confinement — the phenomenon that only neutrally colored bound states are observed at low energies.

Qualitatively, confinement in dual superconductor models can be understood as a result of the dual to the Meissner effect. The Meissner effect says that a superconducting metal will try to expel magnetic field lines from its interior. If a magnetic field is forced to run through the superconductor, the field lines are compressed in magnetic flux "tubes" known as fluxons. In a dual superconductor the roles of magnetic and electric fields are exchanged and the Meissner effect tries to expel electric field lines. Quarks and antiquarks carry opposite color charges, and for a quark–antiquark pair 'electric' field lines run from the quark to the antiquark. If the quark–antiquark pair are immersed in a dual superconductor, then the electric field lines get compressed to a flux tube. The energy associated to the tube is proportional to its length, and the potential energy of the quark–antiquark is proportional to their separation. The potential energy of colored objects becomes infinite in the limit of large separation, all else being equal, though in reality, when it becomes large enough to form a new quark-anti-quark pair from the vacuum, these split the flux tube and bind to the original anti-quark and quark. A quark–antiquark will therefore always bind regardless of their separation, which explains why no unbound quarks are ever found.

Dual superconductors are described by (a dual to) the Landau–Ginzburg model, which is equivalent to the Abelian Higgs model. The MIT bag model boundary conditions for gluon fields are those of the dual color superconductor.

The dual superconductor model is motivated by several observations in calculations using lattice gauge theory. The model, however, also has some shortcomings. In particular, although it confines colored quarks, it fails to confine color of some gluons, allowing colored bound states at energies observable in particle colliders.

== See also ==
- QCD vacuum
- Maximum Abelian gauge
