= Vacuum expectation value =

Type of operator expectation value

In quantum field theory, the vacuum expectation value (VEV) of an operator is its average or expectation value in the vacuum. The vacuum expectation value of an operator O is usually denoted by $\langle O\rangle.$ One of the most widely used examples of an observable physical effect that results from the vacuum expectation value of an operator is the Casimir effect.

This concept is important for working with correlation functions in quantum field theory. In the context of spontaneous symmetry breaking, an operator that has a vanishing expectation value due to symmetry can acquire a nonzero vacuum expectation value during a phase transition. Examples are:

- The Higgs field has a vacuum expectation value of 246 GeV. This nonzero value underlies the Higgs mechanism of the Standard Model. This value is given by $v = 1/\sqrt{\sqrt 2 G_F^0} = 2M_W/g \approx 246.22\, \rm{GeV}$, where M_{W} is the mass of the W Boson, $G_F^0$ the reduced Fermi constant, and g the weak isospin coupling, in natural units. It is also near the limit of the most massive nuclei, at v = 264.3 Da.
- The chiral condensate in quantum chromodynamics, about a factor of a thousand smaller than the above, gives a large effective mass to quarks, and distinguishes between phases of quark matter. This underlies the bulk of the mass of most hadrons.
- The gluon condensate in quantum chromodynamics may also be partly responsible for masses of hadrons.

The observed Lorentz invariance of space-time allows only the formation of condensates which are Lorentz scalars and have vanishing charge. Thus, fermion condensates must be of the form $\langle\overline\psi\psi\rangle$, where ψ is the fermion field. Similarly a tensor field, G_{μν}, can only have a scalar expectation value such as $\langle G_{\mu\nu}G^{\mu\nu}\rangle$.

In some vacua of string theory, however, non-scalar condensates are found. If these describe our universe, then Lorentz symmetry violation may be observable.

== See also ==
- Correlation function (quantum field theory)
- Dark energy
- Spontaneous symmetry breaking
- Vacuum energy
- Wightman axioms
