= Albert Schwarz =

Soviet and American mathematician (born 1934)

Albert Solomonovich Schwarz (/ʃwɔːrts/ SHWORTS; Russian: Альберт Соломонович Шварц; born June 24, 1934) is a Soviet-American mathematician and a theoretical physicist educated in the Soviet Union and now a professor at the University of California, Davis.

== Early life and education ==
Schwarz was born in Kazan to Ashkenazi Jewish parents, Soviet Union. His parents were arrested in the Stalinist purges in 1937.

Schwarz studied under Vadim Yefremovich at Ivanovo Pedagogical Institute, having been denied admittance to Moscow State University on the grounds that he was the son of "enemies of the people."

== Career and later life ==
After defending his dissertation in 1958, he took a job at Voronezh University. In 1964 he was offered a job at Moscow Engineering Physics Institute. He immigrated to the United States in 1989.

== Contributions ==
Schwarz is one of the pioneers of Morse theory and brought up the first example of a topological quantum field theory. The Schwarz genus, one of the fundamental notions of topological complexity, is named after him. Schwarz worked on some examples in noncommutative geometry. He is the "S" in the AKSZ model (named after Mikhail Alexandrov, Maxim Kontsevich, Schwarz, and Oleg Zaboronski).

== Recognition ==
In 1990, Schwarz was an invited speaker of the International Congress of Mathematicians in Kyoto. He was elected to the 2018 class of fellows of the American Mathematical Society.

== Monographs ==
- Topology for physicists, Springer, 1996.
- Quantum field theory and topology, Grundlehren der Math. Wissen. 307, Springer 1993 (translated from Russian original Kvantovaja teorija polja i topologija, Nauka, Moscow, 1989).
- A. S. Švarc, Математические основы квантовой теории поля (Mathematical aspects of quantum field theory), Atomizdat, Moscow, 1975.
- Mathematical Foundations of Quantum Field Theory, 2020.

== Papers (selection) ==
- A. S. Švarc, A volume invariant of coverings (in Russian), Doklady Akademii Nauk SSSR, 105 (1955), pp. 32–34.
- A. S. Švarc, Род расслоенного пространства, Докл. АН СССР (The genus of a fiber space (Russian), Doklady Akademii Nauk SSSR 119 (1958), no. 2, 219–222.
- A. Schwarz, O. Zaboronsky, Supersymmetry and localization, Comm. Math. Phys. 183(2) (1997), 463–476.
- M. Alexandrov, M. Kontsevich, A. Schwarz, O. Zaboronsky, The geometry of the master equation and topological quantum field theory, Int. J. Modern Phys. A12(7):1405–1429, 1997.
- V. Kac, A. Schwarz, Geometric interpretation of the partition function of 2D gravity, Phys. Lett. B257 (1991), nos. 3–4, 329–334.
- A. A. Belavin, A. M. Polyakov, A. S. Schwartz, Yu. S. Tyupkin, Pseudoparticle solutions of the Yang-Mills equations, Phys. Lett. B59 (1975), no. 1, 85–87.
- V. N. Romanov, A. S. Švarc, Anomalies and elliptic operators (Russian), Teoret. Mat. Fiz. 41 (1979), no. 2, 190–204.
- S. N. Dolgikh, A. A. Rosly, A. S. Schwarz, Supermoduli spaces, Comm. Math. Phys. 135 (1990), no. 1, 91–100.

== See also ==
- ADHM construction
- BPST instanton
- Instanton
- Chern–Simons theory
- Schwarz-type TQFTs
- Švarc–Milnor lemma
- Supermanifold
