= Gluon condensate =

Property of the QCD vacuum

In quantum chromodynamics (QCD), the gluon condensate is a non-perturbative property of the QCD vacuum which could be partly responsible for giving masses to light mesons.

If the gluon field tensor is represented as G_{μν}, then the gluon condensate is the vacuum expectation value $\langle G_{\mu\nu}G^{\mu\nu}\rangle$. It is not clear yet whether this condensate is related to any of the known phase changes in quark matter. There have been scattered studies of other types of gluon condensates, involving a different number of gluon fields.

For more on the context in which this quantity occurs, see the article on the QCD vacuum.

== See also ==
- Quantum chromodynamics
- QCD vacuum and chiral condensates
- Vacuum in quantum field theory
- Quark–gluon plasma
- QCD matter
