= Andrei Slavnov =

Russian physicist (1939–2022)

Andrei Alekseevich Slavnov (Russian: Андрей Алексеевич Славнов; 22 December 1939 – 25 August 2022) was a Russian theoretical physicist, known for Slavnov–Taylor identities.

== Life and career ==
Slavnov was born in Moscow on 22 December 1939. He graduated in physics in 1962 from Moscow State University and received in 1965 his Russian candidate degree (Ph.D.) from the Steklov Institute. He then worked at the Steklov Institute in the department of theoretical physics, most recently as a principal researcher. In 1972 he received his Russian doctorate (higher doctorate), becoming a professor in 1981. In 1992 he became the head of the department of quantum field theory and later became the head of the department of theoretical physics at the Steklov Institute. From 1991, he was also the chair of the department of theoretical physics at Moscow State University.

Slavnov's research dealt with quantum field theory (including renormalization and non-perturbative methods), supersymmetry, gauge theory, and lattice gauge theory.

Slavnov–Taylor identities, named after him and John C. Taylor, are non-abelian generalizations of Ward–Takahashi identities.

Slavnov received in 2013 the Pomeranchuk Prize, in 1999 the Humboldt Research Award, in 2007 the Fock Prize of the Russian Academy of Sciences and in 1995 the Russian State Prize. In 1974 he was an Invited Speaker at the ICM in Vancouver. He became in 1987 a corresponding member and in 2000 a full member of the Russian Academy of Sciences. Slavnov was also an editor for the journal Theoretical and Mathematical Physics.

Slavnov died on 25 August 2022, at the age of 82.

== Selected publications ==
- with Ludvig Dmitrievich Faddeev: Gauge Fields. Introduction to Quantum Theory, Addison-Wesley, 2nd edition 1991 (1st English-language edition, Benjamin 1980; Russian original published by Nauka, Moscow 1978)
- 60 years to nonabelian gauge fields." In Particle Physics at the Year of Light: Proceedings of the Seventeenth Lomonosov Conference on Elementary Particle Physics, pp. 435–442. 2017. arXiv.org preprint
