= Slavnov–Taylor identities =

Non-abelian version of Ward-Takahashi identities

In quantum field theory, a Slavnov–Taylor identity is the non-Abelian generalisation of a Ward–Takahashi identity, which in turn is an identity between correlation functions that follows from the global or gauged symmetries of a theory, and which remains valid after renormalization. The identity was originally discovered by Gerard 't Hooft, and it is named after Andrei Slavnov and John C. Taylor who rephrased the identity to hold off the mass shell.
