= Topological complexity =

Concept in topology

In mathematics, topological complexity of a topological space X (also denoted by TC(X)) is a topological invariant closely connected to the motion planning problem, introduced by Michael Farber in 2003.

== Definition ==
Let X be a topological space and $PX=\{\gamma: [0,1]\,\to\,X\}$ be the space of all continuous paths in X. Define the projection $\pi: PX\to\,X\times X$ by $\pi(\gamma)=(\gamma(0), \gamma(1))$. The topological complexity is the minimal number k such that

- there exists an open cover $\{U_i\}_{i=1}^k$ of $X\times X$,
- for each $i=1,\ldots,k$, there exists a local section $s_i:\,U_i\to\, PX.$

== Examples ==
- The topological complexity: TC(X) = 1 if and only if X is contractible.
- The topological complexity of the sphere $S^n$ is 2 for n odd and 3 for n even. For example, in the case of the circle $S^1$, we may define a path between two points to be the geodesic between the points, if it is unique. Any pair of antipodal points can be connected by a counter-clockwise path.
- If $F(\R^m,n)$ is the configuration space of n distinct points in the Euclidean m-space, then

$$TC(F(\R^m,n))=\begin{cases} 2n-1 & \mathrm{for\,\, {\it m}\,\, odd} \\ 2n-2 & \mathrm{for\,\, {\it m}\,\, even.} \end{cases}$$

- The topological complexity of the Klein bottle is 5.
