= Gerard 't Hooft =

Dutch theoretical physicist

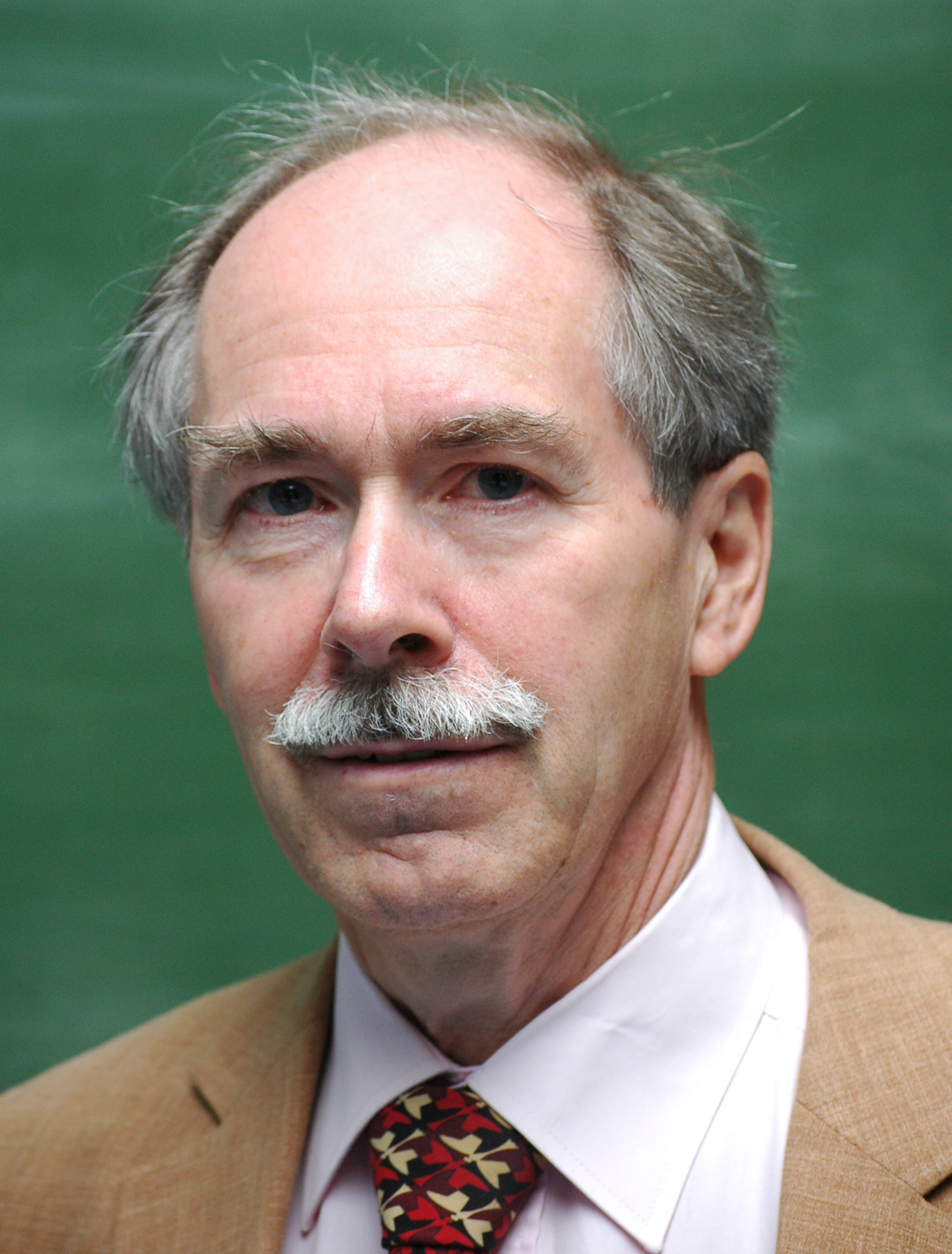
- 't Hooft in November 2008
- Born: 5 July 1946 (age 80); Den Helder, Netherlands
- Education: Utrecht University
- Known for: Quantum field theory Quantum gravity 't Hooft condition 't Hooft–Polyakov monopole 't Hooft symbol 't Hooft loop Feynman–'t Hooft gauge Black hole complementarity Minimal subtraction scheme Holographic principle Renormalization of Yang–Mills theory Dimensional regularization Renormalon; 1/N expansion
- Spouse: Albertha A. Schik
- Children: Saskia A. Eisberg-'t Hooft, Ellen M. 't Hooft
- Awards: Heineman Prize (1979); Wolf Prize (1981); Lorentz Medal (1986); Spinoza Prize (1995); Franklin Medal (1995); Nobel Prize in Physics (1999); High Energy and Particle Physics Prize (1999); Lomonosov Gold Medal (2010); Breakthrough Prize (2025)
- Scientific career
- Fields: Theoretical physics
- Workplaces: Utrecht University
- Doctoral advisor: Martinus J. G. Veltman
- Doctoral students: Robbert Dijkgraaf; Herman Verlinde; Max Welling

Gerardus "Gerard" 't Hooft (Dutch: [ˈɣeːrɑrt ət ˈɦoːft]; born 5 July 1946) is a Dutch theoretical physicist and professor emeritus at Utrecht University, the Netherlands. He shared the 1999 Nobel Prize in Physics with his thesis advisor Martinus J. G. Veltman "for elucidating the quantum structure of electroweak interactions."

His work concentrates on gauge theory, black holes, quantum gravity and fundamental aspects of quantum mechanics. His contributions to physics include: a proof that gauge theories are renormalizable; dimensional regularization; and the holographic principle.

== Biography ==
=== Early life ===
't Hooft was born in Den Helder on 5 July 1946, to Hendrik 't Hooft and Margaretha Agnes 'Peggy' van Kampen, but grew up in The Hague. He was the middle child in a family of three. He comes from a family of scholars. His great-uncle was Nobel Prize laureate Frits Zernike; his maternal grandfather was Pieter Nicolaas van Kampen, a professor of zoology at Leiden University; his uncle Nico van Kampen was a professor of theoretical physics at Utrecht University, and his father was a maritime engineer. Following his family's footsteps, he showed an interest in science at an early age. When his primary school teacher asked him what he wanted to be when he grew up, he replied, "a man who knows everything."

After primary school Gerard attended the Dalton Lyceum, a school that implemented the Dalton Plan, an educational method that suited him well. He excelled in science and mathematics. At the age of sixteen, he won a silver medal in the second Dutch Math Olympiad.

=== Education ===
After 't Hooft passed his secondary-school exams in 1964, he enrolled in the physics program at Utrecht University. He opted for Utrecht instead of the much closer Leiden, because his uncle was a professor there and he wanted to attend his lectures. Since Gerard focused solely on science, his father insisted he join the Utrechtsch Studenten Corps, a student association, in the hope that he would engage in activities outside of studying. To some extent this worked: During his studies he was a coxswain with the rowing club "Triton" and organized a national congress for science students with the science discussion club "Christiaan Huygens".

In the course of his studies, he decided to delve into what he perceived as the heart of theoretical physics: elementary particles. His uncle had grown to dislike the subject and in particular its practitioners. When it became time to write his doctoraalscriptie (former name of the Dutch equivalent of a master's thesis) in 1968, 't Hooft turned to Martinus Veltman, the newly appointed professor who specialized in Yang–Mills theory. At the time, this subject was considered relatively fringe, because it was thought that it could not be renormalized. His assignment was to study the Adler–Bell–Jackiw anomaly, a mismatch in the theory of the decay of neutral pions; formal arguments forbid the decay into photons, whereas practical calculations and experiments showed that this was the primary form of decay. The resolution of the problem was completely unknown at the time, and 't Hooft was unable to provide one.

In 1969, 't Hooft began his doctoral research under the guidance of Martinus Veltman. He worked on the same subject as Veltman: the renormalization of Yang–Mills theories. In 1971 his first paper was published. In it he demonstrated how to renormalize massless Yang–Mills fields, and was able to derive relations between amplitudes. These relations would later be generalized by Andrei Slavnov and John C. Taylor and become known as the Slavnov–Taylor identities.

The world took little notice, but Veltman was excited because he realized that the problem he had been working on had been solved. A period of intense collaboration followed, during which they developed the technique of dimensional regularization. Soon, 't Hooft's second paper was ready to be published, in which he showed that Yang–Mills theories with massive fields due to spontaneous symmetry breaking could be renormalized. This paper earned them worldwide recognition and ultimately won them the 1999 Nobel Prize in Physics.

These two papers formed the basis of 't Hooft's 1972 Ph.D. dissertation The Renormalization Procedure for Yang–Mills Fields. That same year he married Albertha A. Schik, a medical student in Utrecht.

=== Career ===
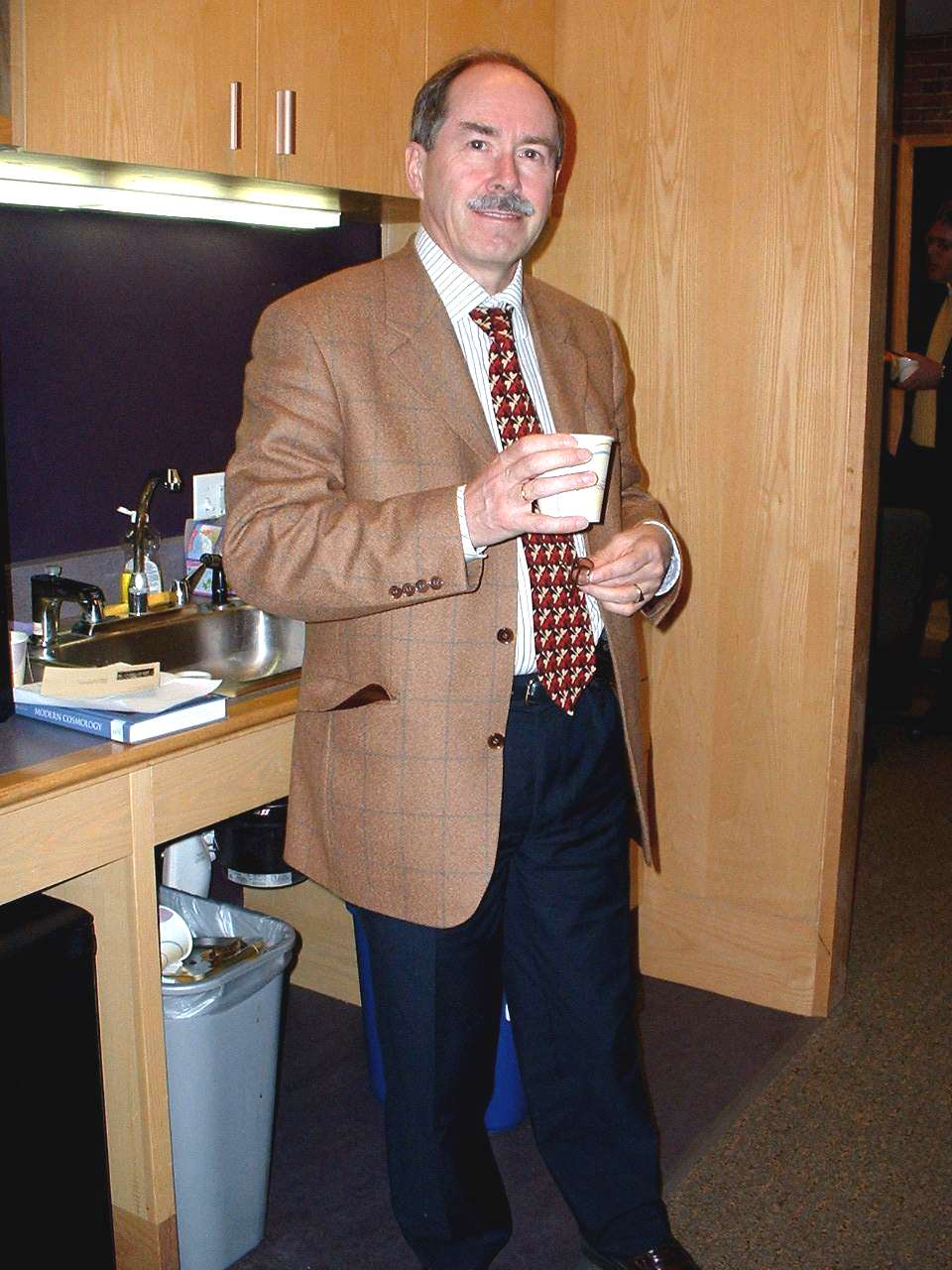
Gerard 't Hooft at Harvard University in 2003

After obtaining his doctorate 't Hooft went to CERN in Geneva, where he held a fellowship. There, he further refined his methods for Yang–Mills theories with Veltman (who had returned to Geneva). During this time, he became interested in the possibility that the strong interaction could be described as a massless Yang–Mills theory. This type of theory he had just proven to be renormalizable, making it susceptible to detailed calculation and comparison with experiments.

According to 't Hooft's calculations, this type of theory possesses just the right kind of scaling properties (asymptotic freedom) that deep inelastic scattering experiments suggest it should have. This was contrary to the popular perception of Yang–Mills theories at the time. Like gravitation and electrodynamics, it was thought that their intensity would decrease with increasing distance between the interacting particles. However, such conventional behavior could not explain the results of deep inelastic scattering, whereas 't Hooft's calculations could.

When 't Hooft mentioned his results at a small conference at Marseille in June 1972, Kurt Symanzik encouraged him to publish them. However, 't Hooft did not, and the findings were later rediscovered and published by Hugh David Politzer, David Gross, and Frank Wilczek in 1973. This led to their receiving the 2004 Nobel Prize in Physics.

In 1974, 't Hooft returned to Utrecht where he became an assistant professor. In 1976, he was invited to take on a guest position at Stanford and a position at Harvard as Morris Loeb Lecturer. His eldest daughter, Saskia Anne, was born in Boston, while his second daughter, Ellen Marga, was born in 1978 after he returned to Utrecht, where he was made full professor. In the 1987–1988 academic year 't Hooft spent a sabbatical in the Boston University Physics Department along with Howard Georgi, Robert Jaffe and others arranged by the then new department chair Lawrence Sulak.

In 2007 't Hooft became the editor-in-chief of Foundations of Physics, where he sought to distance the journal from the controversy of ECE theory and held the position until 2016.

On 1 July 2011 Utrecht University appointed him distinguished professor.

=== Personal life ===
't Hooft lives in Bilthoven. He was married to Albertha A. Schik (Betteke), MD, former anaesthesiologist and occupational health physician, who passed away in July 2026. He has two daughters, Saskia and Ellen, and five grandchildren. He enjoys music and art. His daughter Saskia translated two of his Dutch-language books into English.

== Honors ==
In 1999 't Hooft shared the Nobel prize in Physics with his thesis adviser Veltman for "elucidating the quantum structure of the electroweak interactions in physics". Before that time his work had already been recognized by other notable awards. In 1981, he was awarded the Wolf Prize, possibly the most prestigious prize in physics after the Nobel prize. Five years later he received the Lorentz Medal, awarded every four years in recognition of the most important contributions in theoretical physics. In 1995, he was one of the first recipients of the Spinozapremie, the highest award available to scientists in the Netherlands. In the same year he was also honoured with a Franklin Medal. In 1999 he was awarded the High Energy Particle Physics Prize by the European Physical Society. In 2000, 't Hooft received the Golden Plate Award of the American Academy of Achievement. He was awarded a Special Breakthrough Prize in April 2025 in recognition of his contributions to Fundamental Physics across his career.

Since his Nobel Prize, 't Hooft has received a slew of awards, honorary doctorates and honorary professorships. He was knighted commander in the Order of the Netherlands Lion, and officer in the French Legion of Honor. The asteroid 9491 Thooft has been named in his honor, and he has written a constitution for its future inhabitants.

He is a member of the Royal Netherlands Academy of Arts and Sciences (KNAW) since 1982, where he was made academy professor in 2003. He is also a foreign member of many other science academies, including the French Académie des Sciences, the American National Academy of Sciences and American Academy of Arts and Sciences and the Britain and Ireland based Institute of Physics.

't Hooft has appeared in season 3 of Through the Wormhole with Morgan Freeman.

== Research ==
't Hooft's research interest can be divided in three main directions: 'gauge theories in elementary particle physics', 'quantum gravity and black holes', and 'foundational aspects of quantum mechanics'.

=== Gauge theories in elementary particle physics ===
't Hooft is most famous for his contributions to the development of gauge theories in particle physics. The best known of these is the proof in his PhD thesis that Yang–Mills theories are renormalizable, for which he shared the 1999 Nobel Prize in Physics. For this proof he introduced (with his adviser Veltman) the technique of dimensional regularization.

After receiving his PhD, he became interested in the role of gauge theories in the strong interaction, the leading theory of which is called quantum chromodynamics or QCD. He focused much of his research on the problem of color confinement in QCD, i.e. the observational fact that only color-neutral particles are observed at low energies. This led him to the discovery that SU(N) gauge theories simplify in the large N limit, a fact that has proven important in examining the conjectured correspondence between string theories in an Anti-de Sitter space and conformal field theories in one lower dimension. By solving the theory in one space and one time dimension, 't Hooft was able to derive a formula for the masses of mesons.

He also studied the role of so-called instanton contributions in QCD. His calculations showed that these contributions lead to an interaction between light quarks at low energies that is not present in the standard theory. Studying instanton solutions of Yang–Mills theories, 't Hooft discovered that spontaneously breaking a theory with SU(N) symmetry to a U(1) symmetry leads to the existence of magnetic monopoles. These monopoles are called 't Hooft–Polyakov monopoles, after Alexander Polyakov, who obtained the same result independently.

't Hooft also formulated the anomaly matching condition, according to which anomalies associated with global symmetries must agree between the high-energy and low-energy descriptions of a quantum field theory. The condition places strong constraints on the possible low-energy spectrum of strongly coupled gauge theories.

As another piece of the color confinement puzzle, 't Hooft introduced 't Hooft loops, which are the magnetic dual of Wilson loops. Using these operators he was able to classify different phases of QCD, forming the basis of the QCD phase diagram.

In 1986, he was finally able to show that instanton contributions solve the Adler–Bell–Jackiw anomaly, the topic of his master's thesis.

=== Quantum gravity and black holes ===
When Veltman and 't Hooft moved to CERN after 't Hooft obtained his PhD, Veltman's attention was drawn to the possibility of applying their dimensional regularization techniques to the problem of quantizing gravity. Although it was known that perturbative quantum gravity was not fully renormalizable, they felt important lessons were to be learned by studying the formal renormalization of the theory order by order. This work would be continued by Stanley Deser and another PhD student of Veltman, Peter van Nieuwenhuizen, who later found patterns in the renormalization counter terms, which led to the discovery of supergravity.

In the 1980s, 't Hooft's attention was drawn to the subject of gravity in 3 spacetime dimensions. Together with Deser and Jackiw he published an article in 1984 describing the dynamics of flat space where the only local degrees of freedom were propagating point defects. His attention returned to this model at various points in time, showing that Gott pairs would not cause causality violating timelike loops, and showing how the model could be quantized. More recently he proposed generalizing this piecewise flat model of gravity to 4 spacetime dimensions.

With Stephen Hawking's discovery of Hawking radiation of black holes, it appeared that the evaporation of these objects violated a fundamental property of quantum mechanics, unitarity. 't Hooft refused to accept this problem, known as the black hole information paradox, and assumed that this must be the result of the semi-classical treatment of Hawking, and that it should not appear in a full theory of quantum gravity. He proposed that it might be possible to study some of the properties of such a theory, by assuming that such a theory was unitary.

Using this approach he has argued that near a black hole, quantum fields could be described by a theory in a lower dimension. This led to the introduction of the holographic principle by him and Leonard Susskind.

=== Fundamental aspects of quantum mechanics ===
't Hooft has "deviating views on the physical interpretation of quantum theory". He believes that there could be a deterministic explanation underlying quantum mechanics. Using a speculative model he has argued that such a theory could avoid the usual Bell inequality arguments that would disallow such a local hidden-variable theory. In 2016 he published a book-length exposition of his ideas which, according to 't Hooft, has encountered mixed reactions. In 2025, speaking in his often-times plainspoken manner, he was quoted in Scientific American, "Quantum mechanics is the possibility that you can consider superpositions of states. That's really all there is to it."

== Popular publications ==
- 't Hooft, Gerard (1996). In Search of the Ultimate Building Blocks. doi:10.1017/CBO9781107340855. ISBN 978-0-521-55083-3.
- 't Hooft, Gerard (2008). Playing with Planets. doi:10.1142/6702. ISBN 978-981-279-307-2.
- 't Hooft, Gerard (2014). Time in Powers of Ten. doi:10.1142/8786. ISBN 978-981-4489-80-5.
- Billings, Lee, "Quantum Physics Is Nonsense: Theoretical physicist Gerard 't Hooft reflects on the future" (interview with Gerard 't Hooft), Scientific American, vol. 333, no. 1 (July/August 2025), pp. 104–108. "Quantum mechanics is the possibility that you can consider superpositions of states. That's really all there is to it. And I'd argue that superpositions of states are not real." (p. 106.)
- Curt Jaimungal, 2025 interview with Gerard 't Hooft, "The Nobel Laureate Who (Also) Says Quantum Theory Is 'Totally Wrong'" The Nobel Laureate Who (Also) Says Quantum Theory Is "Totally Wrong"

== Academic publications ==
- 't Hooft, Gerard (2016). The Cellular Automaton Interpretation of Quantum Mechanics (Fundamental Theories of Physics, 185). Vol. 185. doi:10.1007/978-3-319-41285-6. ISBN 978-3-319-41284-9. S2CID 7779840.

== See also ==
- Asymptotic freedom
- Center vortex
- Hierarchy problem
- Mars One (Gerard 't Hooft is a main supporter of the project)
- Pauli–Villars regularization
- Slavnov–Taylor identities
- Superdeterminism
