= John Clayton Taylor =

British mathematical physicist

John Clayton Taylor FRS
- Born: 4 August 1930 (age 96)
- Education: University of Cambridge
- Known for: Slavnov–Taylor identities
- Children: Richard Taylor; Tony Taylor
- Scientific career
- Fields: mathematical physics; theoretical physics
- Institutions: University of Oxford; Robinson College, Cambridge
- Thesis: Renormalisation and Related Topics in Quantum Field Theory (1956)
- Doctoral advisors: Richard J. Eden; Abdus Salam
- Doctoral students: Paul Frampton; John Harnad; David Olive; Douglas Ross; Raymond Streater

John Clayton Taylor FRS (born 4 August 1930) is a British mathematical physicist. He is an Emeritus Professor of Mathematical Physics at the Department of Applied Mathematics and Theoretical Physics of the University of Cambridge and an Emeritus Fellow of Robinson College. He is the father of mathematician Richard Taylor.

== Education ==
Taylor earned his PhD degree from the University of Cambridge in 1956, under the supervision of Richard J. Eden and Abdus Salam. His thesis was titled Renormalisation and Related Topics in Quantum Field Theory.

== Research ==
Taylor has made contributions to quantum field theory and the physics of elementary particles. His contributions include the discovery (also made independently by Lev Landau) of singularities in the analytical structure of the Feynman integrals for processes in quantum field theory, the PCAC nature of radioactive decay of the pion and the discovery in 1971 of the so-called Slavnov–Taylor identities, which control symmetry and renormalisation of gauge theories.

With various collaborators, in 1980 he discovered that real and virtual infrared divergences do not cancel in QCD as they do in QED. They also showed how these infrared divergences exponentiate. In addition, they contributed to the resummation programme in thermal QCD, simplifying the "hard" part of the effective action. Later, they studied complications arising from the non-polynomial nature of the QCD Hamiltonian in the (unitary) Coulomb gauge.

== Books ==
- Gauge Theories of Weak Interactions (1976)
- Hidden Unity in Nature's Laws (2001)
- Gauge Theories in the Twentieth Century (2001)

== Awards and honours ==
Taylor was elected a Fellow of the Royal Society (FRS) in 1981. His certificate of election reads:

Distinguished for his contributions to the Quantum Theory of Fields and the Physics of Elementary Particles. His important works concern (a) the discovery (also made independently by L.D. Landau) of singularities in the analytical structure of the Feynman integrals for processes in Quantum Field Theory, and (b) the discovery of the so-called Slavnov–Taylor identities in Gauge Theories. He has made significant contributions to Quantum Chromodynamics where his use of the axial gauge has made possible recent advances in "perturbative Q.C.D.". He has also contributed to weak interaction theory, over a long period, and most recently to the elucidation of the gauge structure of the unified weak and electromagnetic interaction.
