= 't Hooft symbol =

Mathematical symbol used in algebras

The 't Hooft symbol is a rank-3 tensor which mixes the properties of both the Kronecker delta and the Levi-Civita symbol. It was introduced by Gerard 't Hooft in 1976 in order to compute the properties of a dilute gas of instantons, specifically BPST instantons. It is a collection of numbers which allows one to express the generators of the SU(2) Lie algebra in terms of the generators of the Lorentz group Lie algebra.

== Definition ==
$\eta^a_{\mu\nu}$ is the 't Hooft symbol:
$$\eta^a_{\mu\nu} = \begin{cases} \epsilon^{a\mu\nu} & \mu,\nu=1,2,3 \\ -\delta^{a\nu} & \mu=4 \\ \delta^{a\mu} & \nu=4 \\ 0 & \mu=\nu=4 \end{cases}$$
Where $\delta^{a\nu}$ and $\delta^{a\mu}$ are instances of the Kronecker delta, and $\epsilon^{a\mu\nu}$ is the Levi–Civita symbol.

In other words, the symbols are defined by

($a=1,2,3 ;~ \mu,\nu=1,2,3,4 ;~ \epsilon_{1 2 3 4}=+1$)

$$\begin{align}
\eta_{a \mu \nu} &= \epsilon_{a \mu \nu 4} + \delta_{a \mu} \delta_{\nu 4} - \delta_{a \nu} \delta_{\mu 4} \\[1ex]
\bar{\eta}_{a \mu \nu} &= \epsilon_{a \mu \nu 4} - \delta_{a \mu} \delta_{\nu 4} + \delta_{a \nu} \delta_{\mu 4}
\end{align}$$
where the latter are the anti-self-dual 't Hooft symbols.

== Matrix form ==
In matrix form, the 't Hooft symbols are
$$\eta_{1\mu\nu} =
\begin{bmatrix}
0 & 0 & 0 & 1  \\
0 & 0 & 1 & 0   \\
0 & -1 & 0 & 0  \\
-1 & 0 & 0 & 0
\end{bmatrix},
\quad
\eta_{2\mu\nu} =
\begin{bmatrix}
0 & 0 & -1 & 0  \\
0 & 0 & 0 & 1   \\
1 & 0 & 0 & 0  \\
0 & -1 & 0 & 0
\end{bmatrix},
\quad
\eta_{3\mu\nu} =
\begin{bmatrix}
0 & 1 & 0 & 0  \\
-1 & 0 & 0 & 0   \\
0 & 0 & 0 & 1  \\
0 & 0 & -1 & 0
\end{bmatrix},$$
and their anti-self-duals are the following:
$$\bar{\eta}_{1\mu\nu} =
\begin{bmatrix}
0 & 0 & 0 & -1  \\
0 & 0 & 1 & 0   \\
0 & -1 & 0 & 0  \\
1 & 0 & 0 & 0
\end{bmatrix},
\quad
\bar{\eta}_{2\mu\nu} =
\begin{bmatrix}
0 & 0 & -1 & 0  \\
0 & 0 & 0 & -1   \\
1 & 0 & 0 & 0  \\
0 & 1 & 0 & 0
\end{bmatrix},
\quad
\bar{\eta}_{3\mu\nu} =
\begin{bmatrix}
0 & 1 & 0 & 0  \\
-1 & 0 & 0 & 0   \\
0 & 0 & 0 & -1  \\
0 & 0 & 1 & 0
\end{bmatrix}.$$

== Properties ==
They satisfy the self-duality and the anti-self-duality properties:
$$\eta_{a\mu\nu} = \tfrac{1}{2} \epsilon_{\mu\nu\rho\sigma} \eta_{a\rho\sigma} \ ,
\qquad
\bar\eta_{a\mu\nu} = - \tfrac{1}{2} \epsilon_{\mu\nu\rho\sigma}
\bar\eta_{a\rho\sigma}$$

Some other properties are
$$\eta_{a\mu\nu} = - \eta_{a\nu\mu} \ ,$$
$$\epsilon_{abc} \eta_{b\mu\nu} \eta_{c\rho\sigma}
= \delta_{\mu\rho} \eta_{a\nu\sigma}
+ \delta_{\nu\sigma} \eta_{a\mu\rho}
- \delta_{\mu\sigma} \eta_{a\nu\rho}
- \delta_{\nu\rho} \eta_{a\mu\sigma}$$
$$\eta_{a\mu\nu} \eta_{a\rho\sigma}
= \delta_{\mu\rho} \delta_{\nu\sigma}
- \delta_{\mu\sigma} \delta_{\nu\rho}
+ \epsilon_{\mu\nu\rho\sigma} \ ,$$
$$\eta_{a\mu\rho} \eta_{b\mu\sigma}
= \delta_{ab} \delta_{\rho\sigma} + \epsilon_{abc} \eta_{c\rho\sigma} \ ,$$
$$\epsilon_{\mu\nu\rho\theta} \eta_{a\sigma\theta}
= \delta_{\sigma\mu} \eta_{a\nu\rho}
+ \delta_{\sigma\rho} \eta_{a\mu\nu}
- \delta_{\sigma\nu} \eta_{a\mu\rho} \ ,$$
$$\eta_{a\mu\nu} \eta_{a\mu\nu} = 12 \ ,\quad
\eta_{a\mu\nu} \eta_{b\mu\nu} = 4 \delta_{ab} \ ,\quad
\eta_{a\mu\rho} \eta_{a\mu\sigma} = 3 \delta_{\rho\sigma} \ .$$

The same holds for $\bar\eta$ except for

$$\bar\eta_{a\mu\nu} \bar\eta_{a\rho\sigma}
= \delta_{\mu\rho} \delta_{\nu\sigma}
- \delta_{\mu\sigma} \delta_{\nu\rho}
- \epsilon_{\mu\nu\rho\sigma} \ .$$

and
$$\epsilon_{\mu\nu\rho\theta} \bar\eta_{a\sigma\theta}
= -\delta_{\sigma\mu} \bar\eta_{a\nu\rho}
- \delta_{\sigma\rho} \bar\eta_{a\mu\nu}
+ \delta_{\sigma\nu} \bar\eta_{a\mu\rho} \ .$$

Furthermore, $\eta_{a\mu\nu} \bar\eta_{b\mu\nu} = 0$ due to different duality properties.

== See also ==
- Instanton
- 't Hooft anomaly
- 't Hooft–Polyakov monopole
- 't Hooft loop
