= Instanton fluid =

Non-perturbative path integral approximation

In quantum field theory, the instanton fluid model is a model of Wick rotated Euclidean quantum chromodynamics. If we examine the path integral of the action, we find that it has infinitely many local minima, corresponding to varying instanton numbers. It turns out that the dominant contribution to the path integral comes from configurations consisting of a pool of instantons and anti-instantons. The exponential suppression coming from the increased action is compensated by the increased phase space factor coming from all the instantons. In other words, the "Euclidean" free energy is minimized by a pool of instantons.

We also know that in the presence of an instanton, left-handed quarks of each flavor will be produced and right-handed quarks annihilated. This evidently will have consequences to the chiral dynamics of the theory.
