= Fermionic condensate =

State of matter

A fermionic condensate (or Fermi–Dirac condensate) is a superfluid phase formed by fermionic particles at low temperatures. It is closely related to the Bose–Einstein condensate, which is commonly in a superfluid phase formed by bosonic particles under similar conditions. Examples of fermionic condensates include superconductors and the superfluid phase of helium-3. The first fermionic condensate in dilute atomic gases was created by a team led by Deborah S. Jin using potassium-40 atoms at the University of Colorado Boulder in 2003.

== Background ==
=== Superfluidity ===
Fermionic condensates are attained at lower temperatures than Bose–Einstein condensates. Fermionic condensates are a type of superfluid. As the name suggests, a superfluid possesses fluid properties similar to those possessed by ordinary liquids and gases, such as the lack of a definite shape and the ability to flow in response to applied forces. However, superfluids possess some properties that do not appear in ordinary matter. For instance, they can flow at high velocities without dissipating any energy—i.e. zero viscosity. At lower velocities, energy is dissipated by the formation of quantized vortices, which act as "holes" in the medium where superfluidity breaks down. Superfluidity was originally discovered in liquid helium-4 whose atoms are bosons, not fermions.

=== Fermionic superfluids ===
It is far more difficult to produce a fermionic superfluid than a bosonic one, because the Pauli exclusion principle prohibits fermions from occupying the same quantum state. However, there is a well-known mechanism by which a superfluid may be formed from fermions: That mechanism is the BCS transition, discovered in 1957 by J. Bardeen, L.N. Cooper, and R. Schrieffer for describing superconductivity. These authors showed that, below a certain temperature, electrons (which are fermions) can pair up to form bound pairs now known as Cooper pairs. As long as collisions with the ionic lattice of the solid do not supply enough energy to break the Cooper pairs, the electron fluid will be able to flow without dissipation. As a result, it becomes a superfluid, and the material through which it flows a superconductor.

The BCS theory was phenomenally successful in describing superconductors. Soon after the publication of the BCS paper, several theorists proposed that a similar phenomenon could occur in fluids made up of fermions other than electrons, such as helium-3 atoms. These speculations were confirmed in 1971, when experiments performed by D.D. Osheroff showed that helium-3 becomes a superfluid below 0.0025 K. It was soon verified that the superfluidity of helium-3 arises from a BCS-like mechanism. (Note: The theory of superfluid helium-3 is a little more complicated than the BCS theory of superconductivity. These complications arise because helium atoms repel each other much more strongly than electrons, but the basic idea is the same.)

=== Condensates of fermionic atoms ===
When Eric Cornell and Carl Wieman produced a Bose–Einstein condensate from rubidium atoms in 1995, there naturally arose the prospect of creating a similar sort of condensate made from fermionic atoms, which would form a superfluid by the BCS mechanism. However, early calculations indicated that the temperature required for producing Cooper pairing in atoms would be too cold to achieve. In 2001, Murray Holland at JILA suggested a way of bypassing this difficulty. He speculated that fermionic atoms could be coaxed into pairing up by subjecting them to a strong magnetic field.

In 2003, working on Holland's suggestion, Deborah Jin at JILA, Rudolf Grimm at the University of Innsbruck, and Wolfgang Ketterle at MIT managed to coax fermionic atoms into forming molecular bosons, which then underwent Bose–Einstein condensation. However, this was not a true fermionic condensate. On December 16, 2003, Jin managed to produce a condensate out of fermionic atoms for the first time. The experiment involved 500,000 potassium-40 atoms cooled to a temperature of 5×10^{−8} K, subjected to a time-varying magnetic field.

== Examples ==
=== Chiral condensate ===
A chiral condensate is an example of a fermionic condensate that appears in theories of massless fermions with chiral symmetry breaking, such as the theory of quarks in Quantum Chromodynamics.

=== BCS theory ===
The BCS theory of superconductivity has a fermion condensate. A pair of electrons in a metal with opposite spins can form a scalar bound state called a Cooper pair. The bound states themselves then form a condensate. Since the Cooper pair has electric charge, this fermion condensate breaks the electromagnetic gauge symmetry of a superconductor, giving rise to the unusual electromagnetic properties of such states.

=== QCD ===
In quantum chromodynamics (QCD) the chiral condensate is also called the quark condensate. This property of the QCD vacuum is partly responsible for giving masses to hadrons (along with other condensates like the gluon condensate).

In an approximate version of QCD, which has vanishing quark masses for N quark flavours, there is an exact chiral SU(N) × SU(N) symmetry of the theory. The QCD vacuum breaks this symmetry to SU(N) by forming a quark condensate. The existence of such a fermion condensate was first shown explicitly in the lattice formulation of QCD. The quark condensate is therefore an order parameter of transitions between several phases of quark matter in this limit.

This is very similar to the BCS theory of superconductivity. The Cooper pairs are analogous to the pseudoscalar mesons. However, the vacuum carries no charge. Hence all the gauge symmetries are unbroken. Corrections for the masses of the quarks can be incorporated using chiral perturbation theory.

=== Helium-3 superfluid ===
A helium-3 atom is a fermion and at very low temperatures, they form two-atom Cooper pairs which are bosonic and condense into a superfluid. These Cooper pairs are substantially larger than the interatomic separation.

== See also ==
- Fermi gas
- Bose gas
