= 't Hooft–Polyakov monopole =

Yang–Mills–Higgs magnetic monopole

In theoretical physics, the 't Hooft–Polyakov monopole is a topological soliton similar to the Dirac monopole but without the Dirac string. It arises in the case of a Yang–Mills theory with a gauge group $G$, coupled to a Higgs field which spontaneously breaks it down to a smaller group $H$ via the Higgs mechanism. It was first found independently by Gerard 't Hooft and Alexander Polyakov.

Unlike the Dirac monopole, the 't Hooft–Polyakov monopole is a smooth solution with a finite total energy. The solution is localized around $r=0$. Very far from the origin, the gauge group $G$ is broken to $H$, and the 't Hooft–Polyakov monopole reduces to the Dirac monopole.

However, at the origin itself, the $G$ gauge symmetry is unbroken and the solution is non-singular also near the origin. The Higgs field $H_i (i=1,2,3)$, is proportional to $x_i f(|x|)$, where the adjoint indices are identified with the three-dimensional spatial indices. The gauge field at infinity is such that the Higgs field's dependence on the angular directions is pure gauge. The precise configuration for the Higgs field and the gauge field near the origin is such that it satisfies the full Yang–Mills–Higgs equations of motion.

== Mathematical details ==
Suppose the vacuum is the vacuum manifold $\Sigma$. Then, for finite energies, as we move along each direction towards spatial infinity, the state along the path approaches a point on the vacuum manifold $\Sigma$. Otherwise, we would not have a finite energy. In topologically trivial 3 + 1 dimensions, this means spatial infinity is homotopically equivalent to the topological sphere $S^2$. So, the superselection sectors are classified by the second homotopy group of $\Sigma$, $\pi_2(\Sigma)$.

In the special case of a Yang–Mills–Higgs theory, the vacuum manifold is isomorphic to the quotient space $G/H$ and the relevant homotopy group is $\pi_2(G/H)$. This does not actually require the existence of a scalar Higgs field. Most symmetry breaking mechanisms (e.g. technicolor) would also give rise to a 't Hooft–Polyakov monopole.

It is easy to generalize to the case of $d+1$ dimensions. We have $\pi_{d-1}(\Sigma)$.

== Monopole problem ==
The "monopole problem" refers to the cosmological implications of grand unification theories (GUT). Since monopoles are generically produced in GUT during the cooling of the universe, and since they are expected to be quite massive, their existence threatens to overclose it. This is considered a "problem" within the standard Big Bang theory. Cosmic inflation remedies the situation by diluting any primordial abundance of magnetic monopoles.

== See also ==
- 't Hooft anomaly
- 't Hooft loop
- 't Hooft symbol
