= Electromagnetism uniqueness theorem =

Providing boundary conditions for Maxwell's equations uniquely fixes a solution

The electromagnetism uniqueness theorem states the uniqueness (but not necessarily the existence) of a solution to Maxwell's equations, if the boundary conditions provided satisfy the following requirements:

1. At $t=0$, the initial values of all fields (E, H, B and D) everywhere (in the entire volume considered) is specified;
2. For all times (of consideration), the component of either the electric field E or the magnetic field H tangential to the boundary surface ($\hat n \times \mathbf{E}$ or $\hat n \times \mathbf{H}$, where $\hat n$ is the normal vector at a point on the boundary surface) is specified.

Note that this theorem must not be misunderstood as that providing boundary conditions (or the field solution itself) uniquely fixes a source distribution, when the source distribution is outside of the volume specified in the initial condition. One example is that the field outside a uniformly charged sphere may also be produced by a point charge placed at the center of the sphere instead, i.e. the source needed to produce such field at a boundary outside the sphere is not unique.

== See also ==
- Maxwell's equations
- Green's function
- Surface equivalence principle
- Uniqueness theorem
