= Surface equivalence principle =

Theorem in electromagnetism

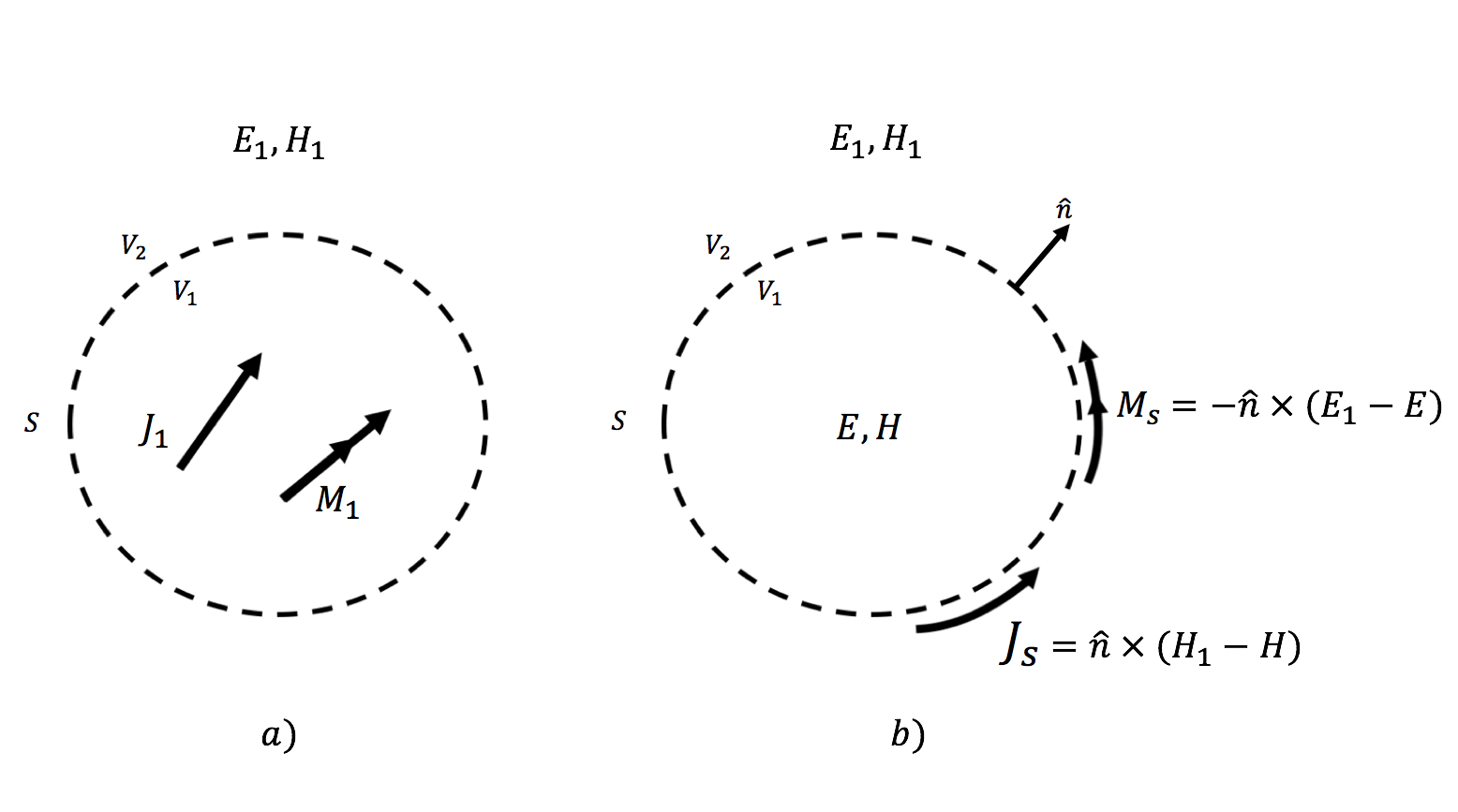
Illustration of the equivalence principle for an imaginary closed surface with impressed electric $(J_s)$ and magnetic current $(M_s)$ sources: original (a) and equivalent (b) problems over the imaginary surface, $S$. $J_1$ and $M_1$ represent the original source distributions inside the surface. The equivalent formulation yields the same external electric and magnetic fields distribution as in the original problem. The internal fields and surface currents are chosen to enforce the boundary conditions.

In electromagnetism, surface equivalence principle or surface equivalence theorem relates an arbitrary current distribution within an imaginary closed surface with an equivalent source on the surface. It is also known as field equivalence principle, Huygens' equivalence principle or simply as the equivalence principle. Being a more rigorous reformulation of the Huygens–Fresnel principle, it is often used to simplify the analysis of radiating structures such as antennas.

Certain formulations of the principle are also known as Love equivalence principle and Schelkunoff equivalence principle, after Augustus Edward Hough Love and Sergei Alexander Schelkunoff, respectively.

== Physical meaning ==
=== General formulation ===
The principle yields an equivalent problem for a radiation problem by introducing an imaginary closed surface and fictitious surface current densities. It is an extension of Huygens–Fresnel principle, which describes each point on a wavefront as a spherical wave source. The equivalence of the imaginary surface currents are enforced by the uniqueness theorem in electromagnetism, which dictates that a unique solution can be determined by fixing a boundary condition on a system. With the appropriate choice of the imaginary current densities, the fields inside the surface or outside the surface can be deduced from the imaginary currents. In a radiation problem with given current density sources, electric current density $J_1$ and magnetic current density $M_1$, the tangential field boundary conditions necessitate that

$$J_s = \hat{n} \times (H_1 - H)$$
$$M_s = -\hat{n} \times (E_1 - E)$$

where $J_s$ and $M_s$ correspond to the imaginary current sources that are impressed on the closed surface. $E$ and $H$ represent the electric and magnetic fields inside the surface, respectively, while $E_1$ and $H_1$ are the fields outside of the surface. Both the original and imaginary currents should produce the same external field distributions.

=== Love and Schelkunoff equivalence principles ===
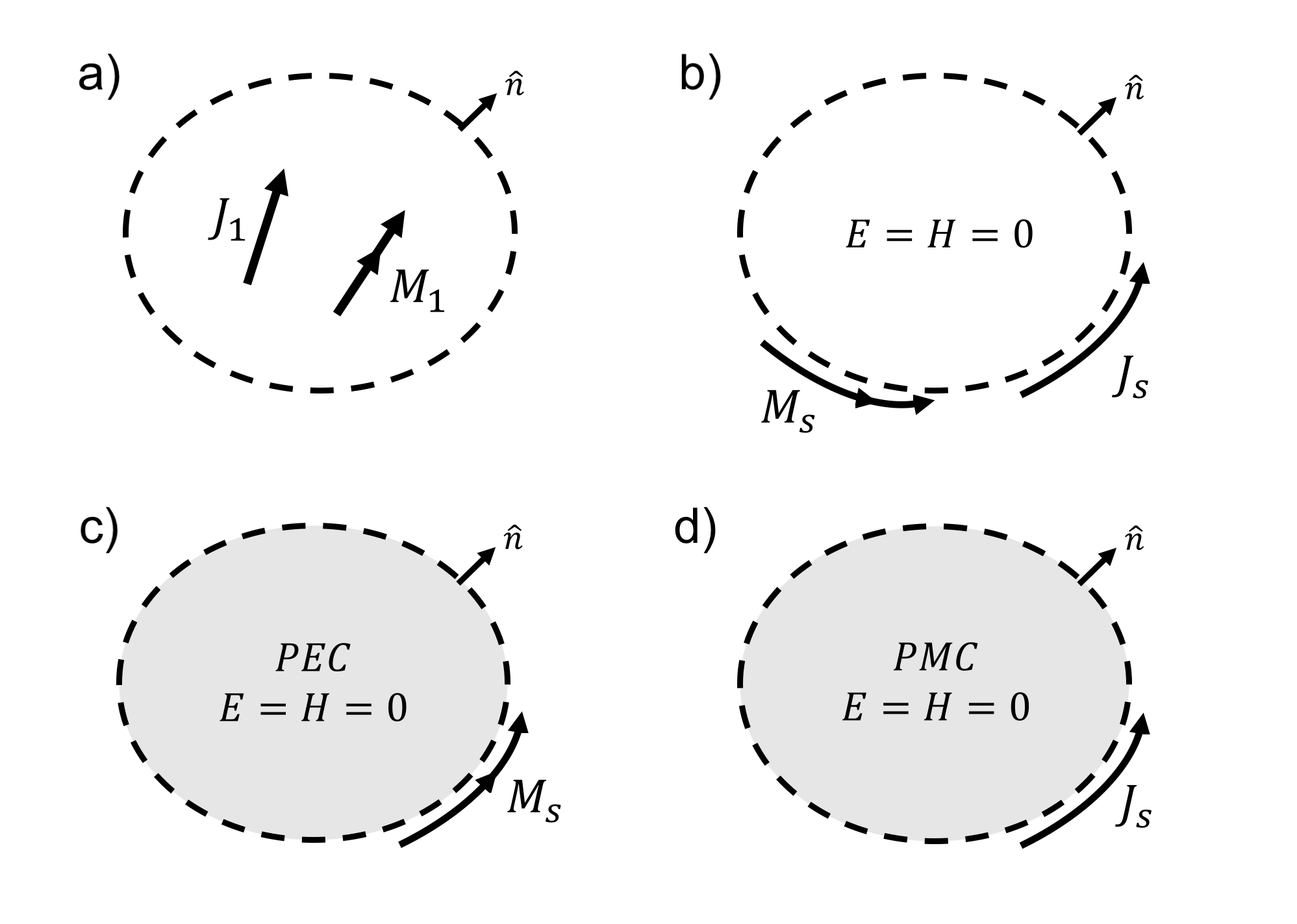
Illustration of Love and Schelkunoff equivalence principles: a) The original problem, b) Love equivalent problem, c) Schelkunoff equivalent problem with perfect electric conductor, d) Schelkunoff equivalent problem with perfect magnetic conductor. All problems have the same external fields.

Per the boundary conditions, the fields inside the surface and the current densities can be arbitrarily chosen as long as they produce the same external fields. Love's equivalence principle, introduced in 1901 by Augustus Edward Hough Love, takes the internal fields as zero:

$$J_s = \hat{n} \times H_1$$
$$M_s = -\hat{n} \times E_1$$

The fields inside the surface are referred as null fields. Thus, the surface currents are chosen so as to sustain the external fields in the original problem. Alternatively, the Love equivalent problem for field distributions inside the surface can be formulated: this requires the negative of surface currents for the external radiation case. Thus, the surface currents will radiate the fields in the original problem in the inside of the surface; nevertheless, they will produce null external fields.

The Schelkunoff equivalence principle, introduced by Sergei Alexander Schelkunoff, substitutes the closed surface with a perfectly conducting material body. In the case of a perfect electrical conductor, the electric currents that are impressed on the surface won't radiate due to Lorentz reciprocity. Thus, the original currents can be substituted with surface magnetic currents only. A similar formulation for a perfect magnetic conductor would use impressed electric currents.

The equivalence principles can also be applied to conductive half-spaces with the aid of method of image charges.

== Applications ==
The surface equivalence principle is heavily used in the analysis of antenna problems to simplify the problem: in many of the applications, the closed surface is chosen so as to coincide with the conductive region, which simplifies the limits of integration. Selected uses in antenna theory include the analysis of aperture antennas and the cavity model approach for microstrip patch antennas. It has also been used as a domain decomposition method for method of moments analysis of complex antenna structures. Schelkunoff's formulation is employed particularly for scattering problems.

The principle has also been used in the analysis design of metamaterials such as Huygens’ metasurfaces and plasmonic scatterers.

== See also ==
- Aperture antennas
- Babinet's principle
- Electromagnetism uniqueness theorem
- Huygens–Fresnel principle
- Reciprocity (electromagnetism)
