= Reciprocity (electromagnetism) =

Theorem in classical electromagnetism

In classical electromagnetism, reciprocity refers to a variety of related theorems involving the interchange of time-harmonic electric current densities (sources) and the resulting electromagnetic fields in Maxwell's equations for time-invariant linear media under certain constraints. Reciprocity is closely related to the concept of symmetric operators from linear algebra, applied to electromagnetism.

Perhaps the most common and general such theorem is Lorentz reciprocity (and its various special cases such as Rayleigh-Carson reciprocity), named after work by Hendrik Lorentz in 1896 following analogous results regarding sound by Lord Rayleigh and light by Helmholtz (Potton 2004). Loosely, it states that the relationship between an oscillating current and the resulting electric field is unchanged if one interchanges the points where the current is placed and where the field is measured. For the specific case of an electrical network, it is sometimes phrased as the statement that voltages and currents at different points in the network can be interchanged. More technically, it follows that the mutual impedance of a first circuit due to a second is the same as the mutual impedance of the second circuit due to the first.

Reciprocity is useful in optics, which (apart from quantum effects) can be expressed in terms of classical electromagnetism, but also in terms of radiometry.

There is also an analogous theorem in electrostatics, known as Green's reciprocity, relating the interchange of electric potential and electric charge density.

Forms of the reciprocity theorems are used in many electromagnetic applications, such as analyzing electrical networks and antenna systems. For example, reciprocity implies that antennas work equally well as transmitters or receivers, and specifically that an antenna's radiation and receiving patterns are identical. Reciprocity is also a basic lemma that is used to prove other theorems about electromagnetic systems, such as the symmetry of the impedance matrix and scattering matrix, symmetries of Green's functions for use in boundary-element and transfer-matrix computational methods, as well as orthogonality properties of harmonic modes in waveguide systems (as an alternative to proving those properties directly from the symmetries of the eigen-operators).

== Lorentz reciprocity ==
Specifically, suppose that one has a current density $\mathbf{J}_1$ that produces an electric field $\mathbf{E}_1$ and a magnetic field $\mathbf{H}_1\, ,$ where all three are periodic functions of time with angular frequency ω, and in particular they have time-dependence $\exp(-i\omega t)\, .$ Suppose that we similarly have a second current $\mathbf{J}_2$ at the same frequency ω which (by itself) produces fields $\mathbf{E}_2$ and $\mathbf{H}_2\, .$ The Lorentz reciprocity theorem then states, under certain simple conditions on the materials of the medium described below, that for an arbitrary surface S enclosing a volume V:

$$\int_V \left[ \mathbf{J}_1 \cdot \mathbf{E}_2 - \mathbf{E}_1 \cdot \mathbf{J}_2 \right] \mathrm{d}V = \oint_S \left[ \mathbf{E}_1 \times \mathbf{H}_2 - \mathbf{E}_2 \times \mathbf{H}_1 \right] \cdot \mathbf{\mathrm{d}S}\ .$$

Equivalently, in differential form (by the divergence theorem):

$$\mathbf{J}_1 \cdot \mathbf{E}_2 - \mathbf{E}_1 \cdot \mathbf{J}_2 = \nabla \cdot \left[ \mathbf{E}_1 \times \mathbf{H}_2 - \mathbf{E}_2 \times \mathbf{H}_1 \right]\ .$$

This general form is commonly simplified for a number of special cases. In particular, one usually assumes that $\ \mathbf{J}_1\$ and $\mathbf{J}_2$ are localized (i.e. have compact support), and that there are no incoming waves from infinitely far away. In this case, if one integrates throughout space then the surface-integral terms cancel (see below) and one obtains:

$$\int \mathbf{J}_1 \cdot \mathbf{E}_2 \, \mathrm{d}V = \int \mathbf{E}_1 \cdot \mathbf{J}_2 \, \mathrm{d}V\ .$$

This result (along with the following simplifications) is sometimes called the Rayleigh-Carson reciprocity theorem, after Lord Rayleigh's work on sound waves and an extension by Carson (1924; 1930) to applications for radio frequency antennas. Often, one further simplifies this relation by considering point-like dipole sources, in which case the integrals disappear and one simply has the product of the electric field with the corresponding dipole moments of the currents. Or, for wires of negligible thickness, one obtains the applied current in one wire multiplied by the resulting voltage across another and vice versa; see also below.

Another special case of the Lorentz reciprocity theorem applies when the volume V entirely contains both of the localized sources (or alternatively if V intersects neither of the sources). In this case:

$$\ \oint_S (\mathbf{E}_1 \times \mathbf{H}_2) \cdot \mathbf{\mathrm{d}S} = \oint_S (\mathbf{E}_2 \times \mathbf{H}_1) \cdot \mathbf{\mathrm{d}S} \ .$$

In practical problems, there are other more generalized forms of Lorentz and other reciprocity relations, in which, in addition to electric current density $\ \mathbf{J}\$, magnetic current density $\ \mathbf{M}\$ is also used. These types of reciprocity relations are usually discussed in electrical engineering literature.

== Reciprocity for electrical networks ==
Above, Lorentz reciprocity was phrased in terms of an externally applied current source and the resulting field. Often, especially for electrical networks, one instead prefers to think of an externally applied voltage and the resulting currents. The Lorentz reciprocity theorem describes this case as well, assuming ohmic materials (i.e. currents that respond linearly to the applied field) with a 3×3 conductivity matrix σ that is required to be symmetric, which is implied by the other conditions below. In order to properly describe this situation, one must carefully distinguish between the externally applied fields (from the driving voltages) and the total fields that result (King, 1963).

More specifically, the $\ \mathbf{J}\$ above only consisted of external "source" terms introduced into Maxwell's equations. We now denote this by $\ \mathbf{J}^{(e)}\$ to distinguish it from the total current produced by both the external source and by the resulting electric fields in the materials. If this external current is in a material with a conductivity σ, then it corresponds to an externally applied electric field $\ \mathbf{E}^{(e)}\$ where, by definition of σ:

$$\ \mathbf{J}^{(e)}=\sigma\mathbf{E}^{(e)}\ .$$

Moreover, the electric field $\mathbf{E}$ above only consisted of the response to this current, and did not include the "external" field $\ \mathbf{E}^{(e)}\ .$ Therefore, we now denote the field from before as $\ \mathbf{E}^{(r)}\ ,$ where the total field is given by $\ \mathbf{E} = \mathbf{E}^{(e)} + \mathbf{E}^{(r)}\ .$

Now, the equation on the left-hand side of the Lorentz reciprocity theorem can be rewritten by moving the σ from the external current term $\mathbf{J}^{(e)}$ to the response field terms $\ \mathbf{E}^{(r)}\ ,$ and also adding and subtracting a $\ \sigma\mathbf{E}_1^{(e)}\mathbf{E}_2^{(e)}\$ term, to obtain the external field multiplied by the total current $\ \mathbf{J} = \sigma\mathbf{E}\ :$

$$\begin{align}
&\int_V \left[ \mathbf{J}_1^{(e)} \cdot \mathbf{E}_2^{(r)} - \mathbf{E}_1^{(r)} \cdot \mathbf{J}_2^{(e)} \right] \operatorname{d}V \\
= {} &\int_V \left[ \sigma \mathbf{E}_1^{(e)} \cdot \left(\mathbf{E}_2^{(r)} + \mathbf{E}_2^{(e)}\right) - \left(\mathbf{E}_1^{(r)} + \mathbf{E}_1^{(e)}\right) \cdot \sigma\mathbf{E}_2^{(e)} \right] \operatorname{d}V \\
= {} &\int_V \left[ \mathbf{E}_1^{(e)} \cdot \mathbf{J}_2 - \mathbf{J}_1 \cdot \mathbf{E}_2^{(e)} \right] \operatorname{d}V\ .
\end{align}$$

For the limit of thin wires, this gives the product of the externally applied voltage (1) multiplied by the resulting total current (2) and vice versa. In particular, the Rayleigh-Carson reciprocity theorem becomes a simple summation:

$$\ \sum_n \mathcal{V}_1^{(n)} I_2^{(n)} = \sum_n \mathcal{V}_2^{(n)} I_1^{(n)}$$

where $\ \mathcal{V}\$ and I denote the complex amplitudes of the AC applied voltages and the resulting currents, respectively, in a set of circuit elements (indexed by n) for two possible sets of voltages $\ \mathcal{V}_1\$ and $\ \mathcal{V}_2\ .$

Most commonly, this is simplified further to the case where each system has a single voltage source $\ \mathcal{V}_\text{s}\ ,$ at $\ \mathcal{V}_1^{(1)} = \mathcal{V}_\text{s}\$ and $\ \mathcal{V}_2^{(2)} = \mathcal{V}_\text{s}\ .$ Then the theorem becomes simply

$$I_1^{(2)} = I_2^{(1)}$$

or in words:

The current at position (1) from a voltage at (2) is identical to the current at (2) from the same voltage at (1).

== Conditions and proof of Lorentz reciprocity ==
The Lorentz reciprocity theorem is simply a reflection of the fact that the linear operator $\operatorname{\hat{O}}$ relating $\mathbf{J}$ and $\mathbf{E}$ at a fixed frequency $\omega$ (in linear media):
$$\mathbf{J} = \operatorname{\hat{O}} \mathbf{E}$$
where
$$\operatorname{\hat{O}} \mathbf{E} \equiv \frac{1}{i\omega} \left[ \frac{1}{\mu} \left( \nabla \times \nabla \times \right) - \; \omega^2 \varepsilon \right] \mathbf{E}$$
is usually a symmetric operator under the "inner product" $(\mathbf{F}, \mathbf{G}) = \int \mathbf{F} \cdot \mathbf{G} \, \mathrm{d}V$ for vector fields $\mathbf{F}$ and $\mathbf{G}\ .$ (Technically, this unconjugated form is not a true inner product because it is not real-valued for complex-valued fields, but that is not a problem here. In this sense, the operator is not truly Hermitian but is rather complex-symmetric.) This is true whenever the permittivity ε and the magnetic permeability μ, at the given ω, are symmetric 3×3 matrices (symmetric rank-2 tensors) – this includes the common case where they are scalars (for isotropic media), of course. They need not be real – complex values correspond to materials with losses, such as conductors with finite conductivity σ (which is included in ε via $\varepsilon \rightarrow \varepsilon + i\sigma/\omega\$) – and because of this, the reciprocity theorem does not require time reversal invariance. The condition of symmetric ε and μ matrices is almost always satisfied; see below for an exception.

For any Hermitian operator $\operatorname{\hat{O}}$ under an inner product $(f,g)\!$, we have $(f,\operatorname{\hat{O}}g) = (\operatorname{\hat{O}}f,g)$ by definition, and the Rayleigh-Carson reciprocity theorem is merely the vectorial version of this statement for this particular operator $\mathbf{J} = \operatorname{\hat{O}} \mathbf{E}\ :$ that is, $(\mathbf{E}_1, \operatorname{\hat{O}}\mathbf{E}_2) = (\operatorname{\hat{O}} \mathbf{E}_1, \mathbf{E}_2)\ .$ The Hermitian property of the operator here can be derived by integration by parts. For a finite integration volume, the surface terms from this integration by parts yield the more-general surface-integral theorem above. In particular, the key fact is that, for vector fields $\mathbf{F}$ and $\mathbf{G}\ ,$ integration by parts (or the divergence theorem) over a volume V enclosed by a surface S gives the identity:
$$\int_V \mathbf{F} \cdot (\nabla\times\mathbf{G}) \, \mathrm{d}V \equiv \int_V (\nabla\times\mathbf{F}) \cdot \mathbf{G} \, \mathrm{d}V - \oint_S (\mathbf{F} \times \mathbf{G}) \cdot \mathrm{d}\mathbf{A}\ .$$

This identity is then applied twice to $(\mathbf{E}_1, \operatorname{\hat{O}} \mathbf{E}_2)$ to yield $(\operatorname{\hat{O}} \mathbf{E}_1, \mathbf{E}_2)$ plus the surface term, giving the Lorentz reciprocity relation.

Conditions and proof of Lorenz reciprocity using Maxwell's equations and vector operations

We shall prove a general form of the electromagnetic reciprocity theorem due to Lorenz which states that fields $\mathbf {E}_1, \mathbf {H}_1$ and $\mathbf {E}_2, \mathbf {H}_2$ generated by two different sinusoidal current densities respectively $\mathbf {J}_1$ and $\mathbf {J}_2$ of the same frequency, satisfy the condition
$$\int_V \left[ \mathbf{J}_1 \cdot \mathbf{E}_2 - \mathbf{E}_1 \cdot \mathbf{J}_2 \right] \mathrm{d}V = \oint_S \left[ \mathbf{E}_1 \times \mathbf{H}_2 - \mathbf{E}_2 \times \mathbf{H}_1 \right] \cdot \mathbf{\mathrm{d}S} .$$

Let us take a region in which dielectric constant and permeability may be functions of position but not of time. Maxwell's equations, written in terms of the total fields, currents and charges of the region describe the electromagnetic behavior of the region. The two curl equations are:
$$\begin{array}{ccc}
\nabla\times\mathbf E & = & - \frac{\partial}{\partial t}\mathbf B\ ,\\
\nabla\times\mathbf H & = & \mathbf J + \frac{\partial}{\partial t}\mathbf D\ .
\end{array}$$

Under steady constant frequency conditions we get from the two curl equations the Maxwell's equations for the Time-Periodic case:
$$\begin{array}{ccc}
\nabla\times\mathbf E & = & - j\omega\mathbf B\ ,\\
\nabla\times\mathbf H & = & \mathbf J + j\omega\mathbf D\ .
\end{array}$$

It must be recognized that the symbols in the equations of this article represent the complex multipliers of $e^{j\omega t}$, giving the in-phase and out-of-phase parts with respect to the chosen reference. The complex vector multipliers of $e^{j\omega t}$ may be called vector phasors by analogy to the complex scalar quantities which are commonly referred to as phasors.

An equivalence of vector operations shows that
$$\mathbf H\cdot(\nabla \times \mathbf E) - \mathbf E \cdot (\nabla \times \mathbf H) = \nabla \cdot (\mathbf E \times \mathbf H)$$
for every vectors $\mathbf E$ and $\mathbf H\ .$

If we apply this equivalence to $\mathbf {E}_1$ and $\mathbf {H}_2$ we get:
$$\mathbf {H}_2 \cdot (\nabla\times\mathbf {E}_1)-\mathbf {E}_1\cdot(\nabla\times\mathbf {H}_2) = \nabla\cdot(\mathbf {E}_1 \times\mathbf {H}_2)\ .$$

If products in the Time-Periodic equations are taken as indicated by this last equivalence, and added,
$$-\mathbf{H}_2\cdot j\omega \mathbf{B}_1 - \mathbf{E}_1 \cdot j\omega \mathbf{D}_2 - \mathbf{E}_1 \cdot \mathbf{J}_2 = \nabla \cdot(\mathbf{E}_1 \times \mathbf{H}_2)\ .$$

This now may be integrated over the volume of concern,
$$\int_V \left(\mathbf{H}_2 \cdot j \omega \mathbf{B}_1+\mathbf{E}_1 \cdot j\omega \mathbf{D}_2+\mathbf{E}_1\mathbf{J}_2\right) \mathrm{d}V = -\int_V \nabla \cdot (\mathbf{E}_1 \times \mathbf{H}_2) \mathrm{d}V\ .$$

From the divergence theorem the volume integral of $\operatorname{div}(\mathbf{E}_1\times\mathbf{H}_2)$ equals the surface integral of $\mathbf{E}_1\times\mathbf{H}_2$ over the boundary.
$$\int_V \left(\mathbf{H}_2 \cdot j\omega\mathbf{B}_1+\mathbf{E}_1\cdot j\omega\mathbf{D}_2+\mathbf{E}_1\cdot\mathbf{J}_2\right) \mathrm{d}V = -\oint_S(\mathbf{E}_1 \times \mathbf{H}_2)\cdot \widehat{\mathrm{d}S}\ .$$

This form is valid for general media, but in the common case of linear, isotropic, time-invariant materials, ε is a scalar independent of time. Then generally as physical magnitudes $\mathbf D = \epsilon\mathbf E$ and $\mathbf B = \mu \mathbf H\ .$

Last equation then becomes
$$\int_V \left(\mathbf{H}_2 \cdot j \omega\mu\mathbf{H}_1+\mathbf{E}_1 \cdot j \omega \epsilon\mathbf{E}_2 + \mathbf{E}_1 \cdot \mathbf{J}_2\right) \mathrm{d}V = -\oint_S(\mathbf{E}_1\times\mathbf{H}_2) \cdot \widehat{\mathrm{d}S}\ .$$

In an exactly analogous way we get for vectors $\mathbf{E}_2$ and $\mathbf{H}_1$ the following expression:
$$\int_V \left(\mathbf{H}_1 \cdot j \omega \mu \mathbf{H}_2+\mathbf{E}_2 \cdot j \omega \epsilon\mathbf{E}_1 + \mathbf{E}_2 \cdot \mathbf{J}_1\right) \operatorname{d}V = -\oint_S(\mathbf{E}_2\times\mathbf{H}_1) \cdot \widehat{\mathrm{d}S}\ .$$

Subtracting the two last equations by members we get
$$\int_V \left[ \mathbf{J}_1 \cdot \mathbf{E}_2 - \mathbf{E}_1 \cdot \mathbf{J}_2 \right] \operatorname{d}V = \oint_S \left[ \mathbf{E}_1 \times \mathbf{H}_2 - \mathbf{E}_2 \times \mathbf{H}_1 \right] \cdot \mathbf{\mathrm{d}S}\ .$$
and equivalently in differential form
$$\ \mathbf{J}_1 \cdot \mathbf{E}_2 - \mathbf{E}_1 \cdot \mathbf{J}_2 = \nabla \cdot \left[ \mathbf{E}_1 \times \mathbf{H}_2 - \mathbf{E}_2 \times \mathbf{H}_1 \right]\$$
Q.E.D.

=== Surface-term cancellation ===
The cancellation of the surface terms on the right-hand side of the Lorentz reciprocity theorem, for an integration over all space, is not entirely obvious but can be derived in a number of ways. A rigorous treatment of the surface integral takes into account the causality of interacting wave field states: The surface-integral contribution at infinity vanishes for the time-convolution interaction of two causal wave fields only (the time-correlation interaction leads to a non-zero contribution).

Another simple argument would be that the fields goes to zero at infinity for a localized source, but this argument fails in the case of lossless media: in the absence of absorption, radiated fields decay inversely with distance, but the surface area of the integral increases with the square of distance, so the two rates balance one another in the integral.

Instead, it is common (e.g. King, 1963) to assume that the medium is homogeneous and isotropic sufficiently far away. In this case, the radiated field asymptotically takes the form of planewaves propagating radially outward (in the $\operatorname{\hat{O}}{\mathbf{r}}$ direction) with $\operatorname{\hat{O}}{\mathbf{r}} \cdot \mathbf{E} = 0$ and $\mathbf{H} = \hat{\mathbf{r}} \times \mathbf{E} / Z$ where Z is the scalar impedance $\sqrt{ \mu / \epsilon}$ of the surrounding medium. Then it follows that $\ \mathbf{E}_1 \times \mathbf{H}_2 = \frac{ \mathbf{E}_1 \times \hat{\mathbf{r}} \times \mathbf{E}_2 }{Z}\ ,$ which by a simple vector identity equals $\frac{ \mathbf{E}_1 \cdot \mathbf{E}_2}{Z}\ \hat{\mathbf{r}}\ .$ Similarly, $\mathbf{E}_2 \times \mathbf{H}_1 = \frac{ \mathbf{E}_2 \cdot \mathbf{E}_1 }{Z} \ \hat{\mathbf{r}}$ and the two terms cancel one another.

The above argument shows explicitly why the surface terms can cancel, but lacks generality. Alternatively, one can treat the case of lossless surrounding media with radiation boundary conditions imposed via the limiting absorption principle (LAP): Taking the limit as the losses (the imaginary part of ε) go to zero. For any nonzero loss, the fields decay exponentially with distance and the surface integral vanishes, regardless of whether the medium is homogeneous. Since the left-hand side of the Lorentz reciprocity theorem vanishes for integration over all space with any non-zero losses, it must also vanish in the limit as the losses go to zero. (Note that the LAP implicitly imposes the Sommerfeld radiation condition of zero incoming waves from infinity, because otherwise even an arbitrarily small loss would eliminate the incoming waves and the limit would not give the lossless solution.)

=== Reciprocity and Green's function ===
The inverse of the operator $\operatorname{\hat{O}}\ ,$ i.e., in $\mathbf{E} = \operatorname{\hat{O}}^{-1} \mathbf{J}$ (which requires a specification of the boundary conditions at infinity in a lossless system), has the same symmetry as $\operatorname{\hat{O}}$ and is essentially a Green's function convolution. So, another perspective on Lorentz reciprocity is that it reflects the fact that convolution with the electromagnetic Green's function is a complex-symmetric (or anti-Hermitian, below) linear operation under the appropriate conditions on ε and μ. More specifically, the Green's function can be written as $G_{nm}(\mathbf{x}',\mathbf{x})$ giving the n-th component of $\mathbf{E}$ at $\mathbf{x}'$ from a point dipole current in the m-th direction at $\mathbf{x}$ (essentially, $G$ gives the matrix elements of $\operatorname{\hat{O}}^{-1}$), and Rayleigh-Carson reciprocity is equivalent to the statement that $G_{nm}(\mathbf{x}',\mathbf{x}) = G_{mn}(\mathbf{x},\mathbf{x}')\ .$ Unlike $\operatorname{\hat{O}}\ ,$ it is not generally possible to give an explicit formula for the Green's function (except in special cases such as homogeneous media), but it is routinely computed by numerical methods.

=== Lossless magneto-optic materials ===
One case in which ε is not a symmetric matrix is for magneto-optic materials, in which case the usual statement of Lorentz reciprocity does not hold (see below for a generalization, however). If we allow magneto-optic materials, but restrict ourselves to the situation where material absorption is negligible, then ε and μ are in general 3×3 complex Hermitian matrices. In this case, the operator $\ \frac{1}{\mu} \left(\nabla \times \nabla \times\right) - \frac{\omega^2}{c^2} \varepsilon$ is Hermitian under the conjugated inner product $(\mathbf{F}, \mathbf{G}) = \int \mathbf{F}^* \cdot \mathbf{G} \, \mathrm{d}V\ ,$ and a variant of the reciprocity theorem still holds:
$$- \int_V \left[ \mathbf{J}_1^* \cdot \mathbf{E}_2 + \mathbf{E}_1^* \cdot \mathbf{J}_2 \right] \mathrm{d}V = \oint_S \left[ \mathbf{E}_1^* \times \mathbf{H}_2 + \mathbf{E}_2 \times \mathbf{H}_1^* \right] \cdot \mathbf{\mathrm{d}A}$$
where the sign changes come from the $\frac{1}{i\omega}$ in the equation above, which makes the operator $\operatorname{\hat{O}}$ anti-Hermitian (neglecting surface terms). For the special case of $\mathbf{J}_1 = \mathbf{J}_2\ ,$ this gives a re-statement of conservation of energy or Poynting's theorem (since here we have assumed lossless materials, unlike above): The time-average rate of work done by the current (given by the real part of $- \mathbf{J}^* \cdot \mathbf{E}$) is equal to the time-average outward flux of power (the integral of the Poynting vector). By the same token, however, the surface terms do not in general vanish if one integrates over all space for this reciprocity variant, so a Rayleigh-Carson form does not hold without additional assumptions.

The fact that magneto-optic materials break Rayleigh-Carson reciprocity is the key to devices such as Faraday isolators and circulators. A current on one side of a Faraday isolator produces a field on the other side but not vice versa.

=== Generalization to non-symmetric materials ===
For a combination of lossy and magneto-optic materials, and in general when the ε and μ tensors are neither symmetric nor Hermitian matrices, one can still obtain a generalized version of Lorentz reciprocity by considering $(\mathbf{J}_1, \mathbf{E}_1)$ and $(\mathbf{J}_2, \mathbf{E}_2)$ to exist in different systems.

In particular, if $(\mathbf{J}_1, \mathbf{E}_1)$ satisfy Maxwell's equations at ω for a system with materials $(\varepsilon_1, \mu_1)\ ,$ and $(\mathbf{J}_2, \mathbf{E}_2)$ satisfy Maxwell's equations at ω for a system with materials $\left(\varepsilon_1^\mathsf{T}, \mu_1^\mathsf{T} \right)\ ,$ where ${}^\mathsf{T}$ denotes the transpose, then the equation of Lorentz reciprocity holds. This can be further generalized to bi-anisotropic materials by transposing the full 6×6 susceptibility tensor.

=== Exceptions to reciprocity ===
For nonlinear media, no reciprocity theorem generally holds. Reciprocity also does not generally apply for time-varying ("active") media; for example, when ε is modulated in time by some external process. (In both of these cases, the frequency ω is not generally a conserved quantity.)

== Feld-Tai reciprocity ==
In 1992, a closely related reciprocity theorem was articulated independently by Y.A. Feld and C.T. Tai, and is known as Feld-Tai reciprocity or the Feld-Tai lemma. It relates two time-harmonic localized current sources and the resulting magnetic fields:

$$\int \mathbf{J}_1 \cdot \mathbf{H}_2 \, \operatorname{d}V = \int \mathbf{H}_1 \cdot \mathbf{J}_2 \, \operatorname{d}V\ .$$

However, the Feld-Tai lemma is only valid under much more restrictive conditions than Lorentz reciprocity. It generally requires time-invariant linear media with an isotropic homogeneous impedance, i.e. a constant scalar μ/ε ratio, with the possible exception of regions of perfectly conducting material.

More precisely, Feld-Tai reciprocity requires the Hermitian (or rather, complex-symmetric) symmetry of the electromagnetic operators as above, but also relies on the assumption that the operator relating $\ \mathbf{E}\$ and $\ i \omega \mathbf{J}\$ is a constant scalar multiple of the operator relating $\ \mathbf{H}\$ and $\ \nabla\times (\mathbf{J}/\varepsilon)\ ,$ which is true when ε is a constant scalar multiple of μ (the two operators generally differ by an interchange of ε and μ). As above, one can also construct a more general formulation for integrals over a finite volume.

== Optical reciprocity in radiometric terms ==
Apart from quantal effects, classical theory covers near-, middle-, and far-field electric and magnetic phenomena with arbitrary time courses. Optics refers to far-field nearly-sinusoidal oscillatory electromagnetic effects. Instead of paired electric and magnetic variables, optics, including optical reciprocity, can be expressed in polarization-paired radiometric variables, such as spectral radiance, traditionally called specific intensity.

In 1856, Hermann von Helmholtz wrote:

"A ray of light proceeding from point A arrives at point B after suffering any number of refractions, reflections, &c. At point A let any two perpendicular planes a_{1}, a_{2} be taken in the direction of the ray; and let the vibrations of the ray be divided into two parts, one in each of these planes. Take like planes b_{1}, b_{2} in the ray at point B; then the following proposition may be demonstrated. If when the quantity of light J polarized in the plane a_{1} proceeds from A in the direction of the given ray, that part K thereof of light polarized in b_{1} arrives at B, then, conversely, if the quantity of light J polarized in b_{1} proceeds from B, the same quantity of light K polarized in a_{1} will arrive at A."

This is sometimes called the Helmholtz reciprocity (or reversion) principle. When the wave propagates through a material acted upon by an applied magnetic field, reciprocity can be broken so this principle will not apply. Similarly, when there are moving objects in the path of the ray, the principle may be entirely inapplicable. Historically, in 1849, Sir George Stokes stated his optical reversion principle without attending to polarization.

Like the principles of thermodynamics, this principle is reliable enough to use as a check on the correct performance of experiments, in contrast with the usual situation in which the experiments are tests of a proposed law.

The simplest statement of the principle is if I can see you, then you can see me. The principle was used by Gustav Kirchhoff in his derivation of his law of thermal radiation and by Max Planck in his analysis of his law of thermal radiation.

For ray-tracing global illumination algorithms, incoming and outgoing light can be considered as reversals of each other, without affecting the bidirectional reflectance distribution function (BRDF) outcome.

== Green's reciprocity ==
Whereas the above reciprocity theorems were for oscillating fields, Green's reciprocity is an analogous theorem for electrostatics with a fixed distribution of electric charge (Panofsky and Phillips, 1962).

In particular, let $\phi_1$ denote the electric potential resulting from a total charge density $\rho_1$. The electric potential satisfies Poisson's equation, $-\nabla^2 \phi_1 = \rho_1 / \varepsilon_0$, where $\varepsilon_0$ is the vacuum permittivity. Similarly, let $\phi_2$ denote the electric potential resulting from a total charge density $\rho_2$, satisfying $-\nabla^2 \phi_2 = \rho_2 / \varepsilon_0$. In both cases, we assume that the charge distributions are localized, so that the potentials can be chosen to go to zero at infinity. Then, Green's reciprocity theorem states that, for integrals over all space:

$$\int \rho_1 \phi_2 \operatorname{d}V = \int \rho_2 \phi_1 \operatorname{d}V ~.$$

This theorem is easily proven from Green's second identity. Equivalently, it is the statement that

$$\int \phi_2 ( \nabla^2 \phi_1 ) \operatorname{d}V = \int \phi_1 ( \nabla^2 \phi_2 ) \operatorname{d}V\ ,$$

i.e. that $\nabla^2$ is a Hermitian operator (as follows by integrating by parts twice).

== See also ==
- Surface equivalence principle

== Sources ==
- Landau, L.D.; Lifshitz, E.M. (1960). Electrodynamics of Continuous Media. Reading, MA: Addison-Wesley. §89. Bibcode:1960ecm..book.....L.
- King, R.W.P. (1963). Fundamental Electromagnetic Theory (reprint ed.). New York, NY: Dover. §IV.21.
- Altman, C.; Such, K. (1991). Reciprocity, Spatial Mapping and Time Reversal in Electromagnetics. Dordrecht, NL: Kluwer.
- Lorentz, H.A. (1895–1896). "The theorem of Poynting concerning the energy in the electromagnetic field, and two general propositions concerning the propagation of light" (PDF). Verhandelingen der Koninklijke Akademie van Wetenschappen, Amsterdam [ Treatises of the Royal Academy of Sciences, Amsterdam ] . 4: 176–187 – via Leiden U. (leidenuniv.nl).
- Potton, R.J. (2004). "Reciprocity in optics". Reports on Progress in Physics. 67 (5): 717–754. Bibcode:2004RPPh...67..717P. doi:10.1088/0034-4885/67/5/R03. — A review article on the history of this topic.
- Carson, J.R. (1924). "A generalization of reciprocal theorem". Bell System Technical Journal. 3 (3): 393–399. Bibcode:1924BSTJ....3..393C. doi:10.1002/j.1538-7305.1924.tb00009.x – via Internet Archive (archive.org).
- Carson, J.R. (1930). "The reciprocal energy theorem". Bell System Technical Journal. 9 (4): 325–331. Bibcode:1930BSTJ....9..325C. doi:10.1002/j.1538-7305.1930.tb00369.x – via Internet Archive (archive.org).
- Feld, Ya. N. (1992). "On the quadratic lemma in electrodynamics". Soviet Physics-Doklady. 37: 235–236.
- Tai, C.-T. (1992). "Complementary reciprocity theorems in electromagnetic theory". IEEE Transactions on Antennas and Propagation. 40 (6): 675–681. Bibcode:1992ITAP...40..675T. doi:10.1109/8.144602. hdl:2027.42/21036.
- Panofsky, Wolfgang K.H.; Phillips, Melba (1962). Classical Electricity and Magnetism. Reading, MA: Addison-Wesley.
- Stumpf, M. (2018). Electromagnetic Reciprocity in Antenna Theory. Piscataway, NJ: Wiley-IEEE Press. Bibcode:2017erat.book.....S.
- Stumpf, M. (2020). Time-Domain Electromagnetic Reciprocity in Antenna Modeling. Piscataway, NJ: Wiley-IEEE Press.
- Asadchy, V.S.; Mirmoosa, M.S.; Díaz-Rubio, A.; Fan, S.; Tretyakov, S.A. (October 2020). "Tutorial on electromagnetic nonreciprocity and its origins". Proceedings of the IEEE. 108 (10): 1684–1727. arXiv:2001.04848. Bibcode:2020IEEEP.108.1684A. doi:10.1109/JPROC.2020.3012381.
