= Wendy Taylor (physicist) =

Experimental particle physicist

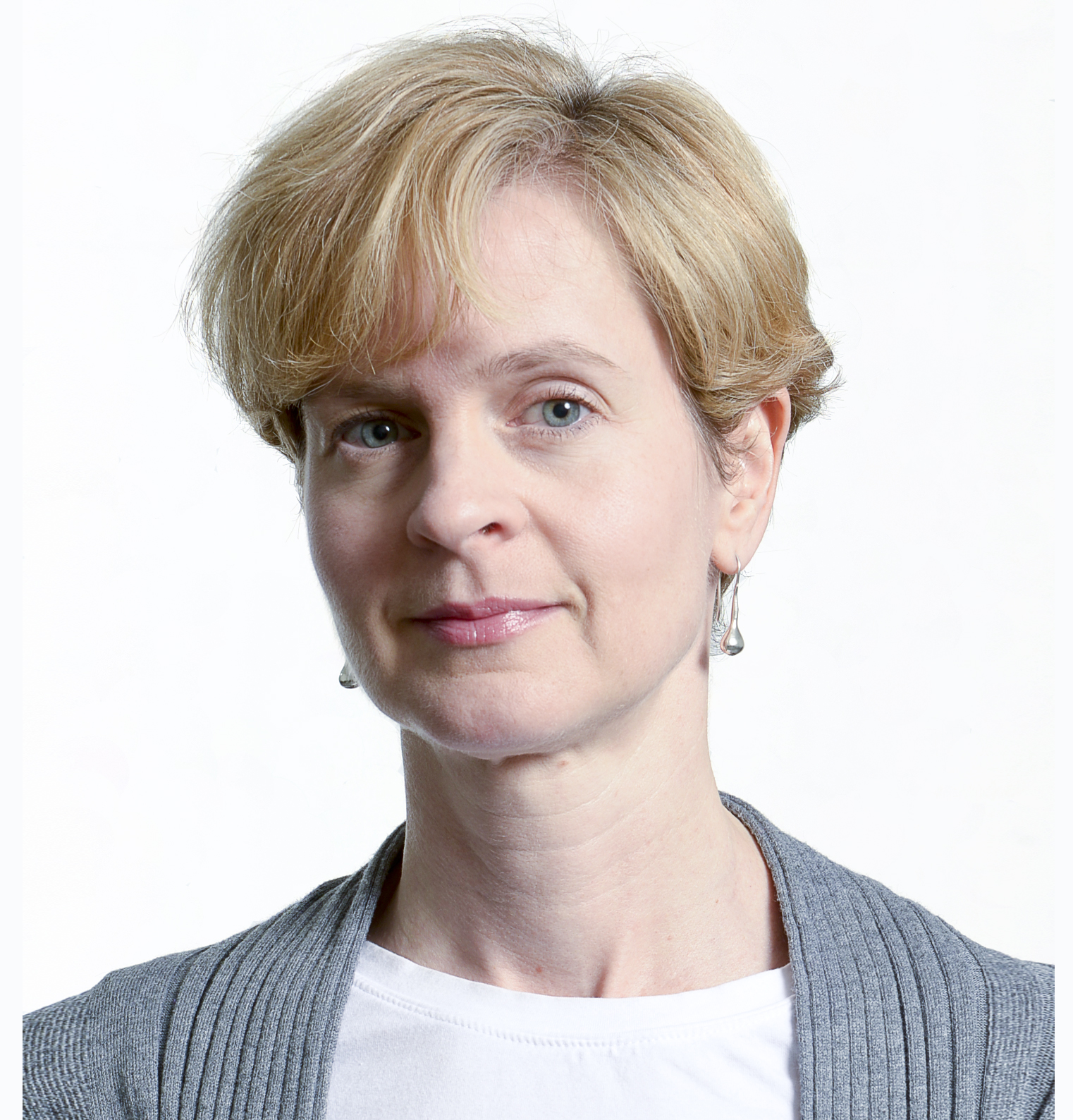
- Taylor in 2012
- Born: 20 February 1967 (age 59)
- Education: University of British Columbia; University of Toronto
- Known for: CP violation Magnetic monopole
- Scientific career
- Workplaces: York University; Stony Brook University
- Thesis: (1999)
- Doctoral advisor: Pekka Sinervo

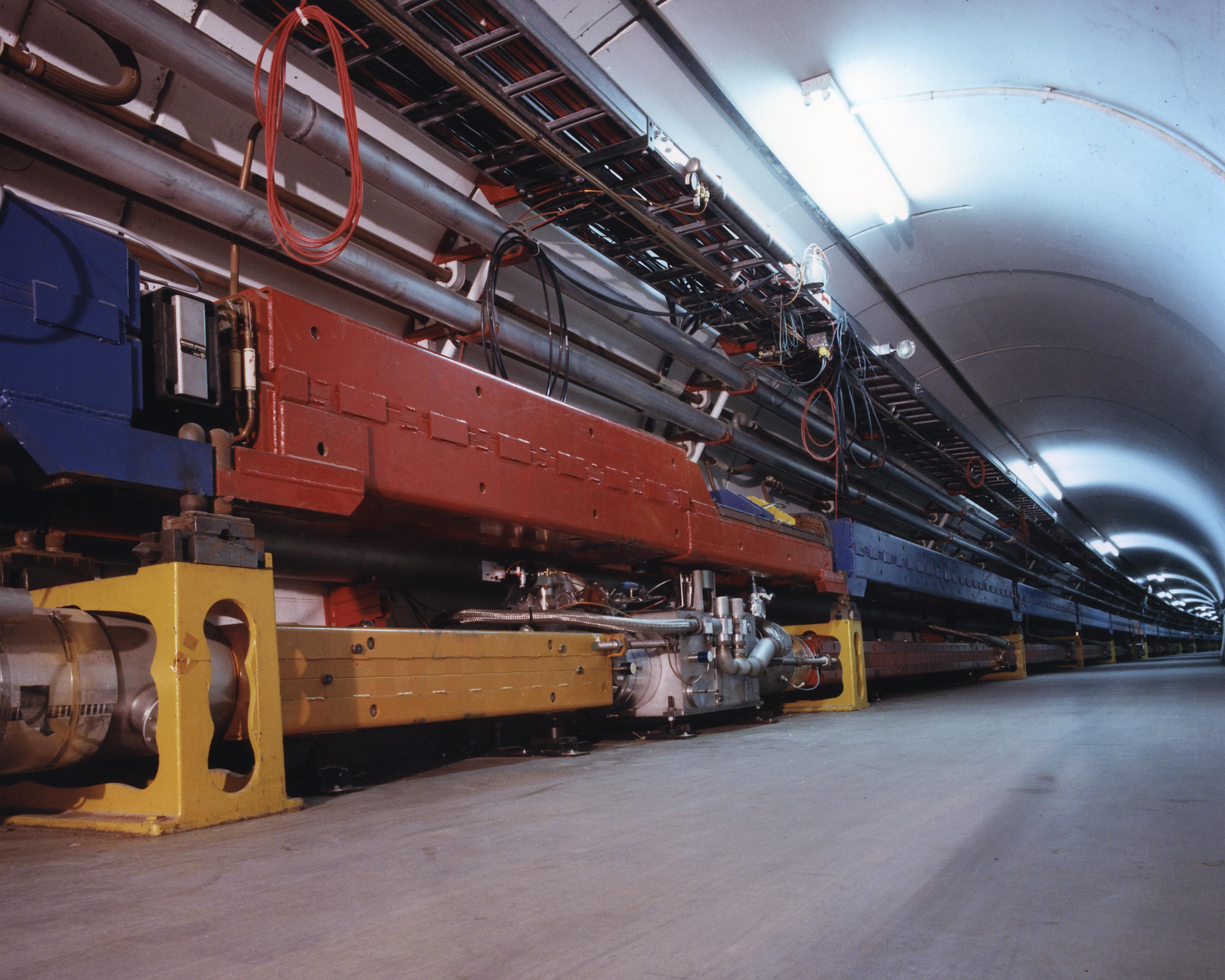
Fermilab's Tevatron Accelerator

Wendy Taylor is an Experimental Particle Physicist at York University and a former Canada Research Chair. She is the lead for York University's ATLAS experiment group at CERN.

== Education ==
Taylor graduated from the University of British Columbia with Bachelors of Science in Physics in 1991. As an undergraduate, she worked at TRIUMF, working on rare kaon decay. She completed her graduate studies at the University of Toronto, where she earned a PhD under the supervision of Pekka Sinervo in 1999. She worked on fragmentation properties of the bottom quark. She worked at Stony Brook University as a postdoctoral fellow. She worked on Fermilab's D0 experiment, building electronics to detect bottom quark particles in real time.

== Research ==
Taylor's research focuses on the magnetic monopole. To do this, she is using the ATLAS detector. Her lab concentrated on the development of firmware for the transition radiation tracker within the ATLAS experiment. She is motivated by predictions from Grand Unified Theory, the observation of quantised charge and potential to reinforce the symmetry in Maxwell's equations.

Taylor spent five years working at the Tevatron particle accelerator. She was concerned when it lost government funding in 2011. Whilst working at the Fermilab Tevatron particle accelerator, Taylor identified CP violation in the decay of bottom quarks, which could contribute to the dominance of matter in the universe. The rate at which she detected CP violation was two-orders of magnitude larger than that predicted by the Standard Model of particle physics.

She joined York University in 2004, where she was one of two women in the department. She held a Tier 2 Canada Research Chair between 2004 and 2014.

Taylor is a member of the American Physical Society and the Particle Physics Division of the Canadian Association of Physicists. In 2024, Taylor was named a Fellow of the Canadian Association of Physicists for "... her outstanding contributions to particle physics including leading collider searches for magnetic monopoles, B-meson oscillations, and CP violation; and for notable service to the physics community, engaging in physics outreach, and tirelessly promoting equity, diversity, and inclusion in physics".
