= Magnetic monopole =

Hypothetical particle with one magnetic pole

It is impossible to make magnetic monopoles from a bar magnet. If a bar magnet is cut in half, it is not the case that one half has the north pole and the other half has the south pole. Instead, each piece has its own north and south poles. A magnetic monopole cannot be created from normal matter such as atoms and electrons, but would instead be a new particle.

In particle physics, a magnetic monopole is a hypothetical particle that is an isolated magnet with only one magnetic pole (a north pole without a south pole or vice versa). A magnetic monopole would have a net north or south "magnetic charge". Modern interest in the concept stems from particle theories, notably grand unified and superstring theories, which predict their existence. The known elementary particles that have electric charge are electric monopoles.

Magnetism in bar magnets and electromagnets is not caused by magnetic monopoles, and indeed, there is no known experimental or observational evidence that magnetic monopoles exist. A magnetic monopole is not necessarily an elementary particle, and models for magnetic monopole production can include (but are not limited to) spin-0 monopoles or spin-1 massive vector mesons. The term "magnetic monopole" only refers to the nature of the particle, rather than a designation for a single particle.

Some condensed matter systems contain effective (non-isolated) magnetic monopole quasi-particles, or contain phenomena that are mathematically analogous to magnetic monopoles.

== Historical background ==
=== Early science and classical physics ===
Many early scientists attributed the magnetism of lodestones to two different "magnetic fluids" ("effluvia"), a north-pole fluid at one end and a south-pole fluid at the other, which attracted and repelled each other in analogy to positive and negative electric charge. However, an improved understanding of electromagnetism in the nineteenth century showed that the magnetism of lodestones was properly explained not by magnetic monopole fluids, but rather by a combination of electric currents, the electron magnetic moment, and the magnetic moments of other particles. Gauss's law for magnetism, one of Maxwell's equations, is the mathematical statement that magnetic monopoles do not exist. Nevertheless, Pierre Curie pointed out in 1894 that magnetic monopoles could conceivably exist, despite not having been seen so far.

=== Quantum mechanics ===
The quantum theory of magnetic charge started with a paper by the physicist Paul Dirac in 1931. In this paper, Dirac showed that if any magnetic monopoles exist in the universe, then all electric charge in the universe must be quantized (Dirac quantization condition). The electric charge is, in fact, quantized, which is consistent with (but does not prove) the existence of monopoles.

Since Dirac's paper, several systematic monopole searches have been performed. Experiments in 1975 and 1982 produced candidate events that were initially interpreted as monopoles, but are now regarded as inconclusive. Therefore, whether monopoles exist remains an open question. Further advances in theoretical particle physics, particularly developments in grand unified theories and quantum gravity, have led to more compelling arguments (detailed below) that monopoles do exist. Joseph Polchinski, a string theorist, described the existence of monopoles as "one of the safest bets that one can make about physics not yet seen". These theories are not necessarily inconsistent with the experimental evidence. In some theoretical models, magnetic monopoles are unlikely to be observed, because they are too massive to create in particle accelerators (see § Searches for magnetic monopoles below), and also too rare in the Universe to enter a particle detector with much probability.

Some condensed matter systems propose a structure superficially similar to a magnetic monopole, known as a flux tube. The ends of a flux tube form a magnetic dipole, but since they move independently, they can be treated for many purposes as independent magnetic monopole quasiparticles. Since 2009, numerous news reports from the popular media have incorrectly described these systems as the long-awaited discovery of the magnetic monopoles, but the two phenomena are only superficially related to one another. These condensed-matter systems remain an area of active research. (See § "Monopoles" in condensed-matter systems below.)

== Poles and magnetism in ordinary matter ==
All matter isolated to date, including every atom on the periodic table and every particle in the Standard Model, has zero magnetic monopole charge. Therefore, the ordinary phenomena of magnetism and magnets do not derive from magnetic monopoles.

Instead, magnetism in ordinary matter is due to two sources. First, electric currents create magnetic fields according to Ampère's law. Second, many elementary particles have an intrinsic magnetic moment, the most important of which is the electron magnetic dipole moment, which is related to its quantum-mechanical spin.

Mathematically, the magnetic field of an object is often described in terms of a multipole expansion. This is an expression of the field as the sum of component fields with specific mathematical forms. The first term in the expansion is called the monopole term, the second is called dipole, then quadrupole, then octupole, and so on. Any of these terms can be present in the multipole expansion of an electric field, for example. However, in the multipole expansion of a magnetic field, the "monopole" term is always exactly zero (for ordinary matter). A magnetic monopole, if it exists, would have the defining property of producing a magnetic field whose monopole term is non-zero.

A magnetic dipole is something whose magnetic field is predominantly or exactly described by the magnetic dipole term of the multipole expansion. The term dipole means two poles, corresponding to the fact that a dipole magnet typically contains a north pole on one side and a south pole on the other side. This is analogous to an electric dipole, which has positive charge on one side and negative charge on the other. However, an electric dipole and magnetic dipole are fundamentally quite different. In an electric dipole made of ordinary matter, the positive charge is made of protons and the negative charge is made of electrons, but a magnetic dipole does not have different types of matter creating the north pole and south pole. Instead, the two magnetic poles arise simultaneously from the aggregate effect of all the currents and intrinsic moments throughout the magnet. Because of this, the two poles of a magnetic dipole must always have equal and opposite strength, and the two poles cannot be separated from each other.

== Maxwell's equations ==
Maxwell's equations of electromagnetism relate the electric and magnetic fields to each other and to the distribution of electric charge and current. The standard equations provide for electric charge, but they posit zero magnetic charge and current. Except for this constraint, the equations are symmetric under the interchange of the electric and magnetic fields. Maxwell's equations are symmetric when the charge and electric current density are zero everywhere, as in vacuum.

Maxwell's equations can also be written in a fully symmetric form if one allows for "magnetic charge" analogous to electric charge. With the inclusion of a variable for the density of magnetic charge, say ρ_{m}, there is also a "magnetic current density" variable in the equations, j_{m}.

If magnetic charge does not exist – or if it exists but is absent in a region of space – then the new terms in Maxwell's equations are all zero, and the extended equations reduce to the conventional equations of electromagnetism such as ∇ ⋅ B = 0 (where ∇⋅ is the divergence operator and B is the magnetic flux density).

Left: Fields due to stationary electric and magnetic monopoles.
Right: In motion (velocity v), an electric charge induces a B field while a magnetic charge induces an E field.

Top: E field due to an electric dipole moment d.
Bottom left: B field due to a magnetic dipole m formed by two hypothetical magnetic monopoles.
Bottom right: B field due to a natural magnetic dipole moment m found in ordinary matter (not from magnetic monopoles). (There should not be red and blue circles in the bottom right image.)

The E fields and B fields are due to electric charge (black/white) and magnetic charge (red/blue).

=== In SI units ===
In the International System of Quantities used with the SI, there are two conventions for defining magnetic charge q_{m}, each with different units: weber (Wb) and ampere-meter (A⋅m). The conversion between them is q_{m}^{[Wb]} = μ_{0}q_{m}^{[A⋅m]}, since the units are 1 Wb = 1 H⋅A = (1 H⋅m^{−1})(1 A⋅m), where H is the henry – the SI unit of inductance.

Maxwell's equations then take the following forms (using the same notation above): (Note: For the convention where magnetic charge has the weber as unit, see Jackson 1999. In particular, for Maxwell's equations, see section 6.11, equation (6.150), page 273, and for the Lorentz force law, see page 290, exercise 6.17(a). For the convention where magnetic charge has units of ampere-meters, see arXiv:physics/0508099v1, eqn (4), for example.)

Maxwell's equations and Lorentz force equation with magnetic monopoles: SI units
Name	Without magnetic monopoles	With magnetic monopoles	
Name	Without magnetic monopoles	Weber convention	Ampere-meter convention
Gauss's law	$\nabla \cdot \mathbf{E} = \frac{\rho_{\mathrm e}}{\varepsilon_0}$		
Ampère's law (with Maxwell's extension)	$\nabla \times \mathbf{B} - \frac{1}{c^2} \frac{\partial \mathbf{E}} {\partial t} = \mu_0 \mathbf{j}_{\mathrm e}$		
Gauss's law for magnetism	$\nabla \cdot \mathbf{B} = 0$	$\nabla \cdot \mathbf{B} = \rho_{\mathrm m}$	$\nabla \cdot \mathbf{B} = \mu_0\rho_{\mathrm m}$
Faraday's law of induction	$-\nabla \times \mathbf{E} - \frac{\partial \mathbf{B}} {\partial t} = 0$	$-\nabla \times \mathbf{E} - \frac{\partial \mathbf{B}} {\partial t} = \mathbf{j}_{\mathrm m}$	$-\nabla \times \mathbf{E} - \frac{\partial \mathbf{B}} {\partial t} = \mu_0\mathbf{j}_{\mathrm m}$
Lorentz force equation	$\mathbf{F} = q_{\mathrm e}\left(\mathbf{E}+\mathbf{v}\times\mathbf{B}\right)$	$$\begin{align} \mathbf{F} ={} &q_{\mathrm e}\left(\mathbf{E}+\mathbf{v}\times\mathbf{B}\right) +\\ &\frac{q_{\mathrm m}}{\mu_0}\left(\mathbf{B}-\mathbf{v}\times \frac{\mathbf{E}}{c^2}\right) \end{align}$$	$$\begin{align} \mathbf{F} ={} &q_{\mathrm e}\left(\mathbf{E}+\mathbf{v}\times\mathbf{B}\right) +\\ &q_{\mathrm m}\left(\mathbf{B}-\mathbf{v}\times\frac{\mathbf{E}}{c^2}\right) \end{align}$$

=== Potential formulation ===
Maxwell's equations can also be expressed in terms of potentials as follows:

Name	Gaussian units	SI units (Wb)	SI units (A⋅m)
Maxwell's equations (assuming Lorenz gauge)	$$\begin{align} \Box \varphi_{\mathrm e} =& -4\pi \rho_{\mathrm e} \\ \Box \mathbf{A}_{\mathrm e} =& -\frac{4\pi}{c} \mathbf{j}_{\mathrm e} \\ \Box \varphi_{\mathrm m} =& -4\pi \rho_{\mathrm m} \\ \Box \mathbf{A}_{\mathrm m} =& -\frac{4\pi}{c} \mathbf{j}_{\mathrm m} \\ \end{align}$$	$$\begin{align} \Box \varphi_{\mathrm e} =& -\frac{\rho_{\mathrm e}}{\varepsilon_0} \\ \Box \mathbf{A}_{\mathrm e} =& -\mu_0 \mathbf{j}_{\mathrm e} \\ \Box \varphi_{\mathrm m} =& -\frac{\rho_{\mathrm m}}{\mu_0} \\ \Box \mathbf{A}_{\mathrm m} =& -\varepsilon_0 \mathbf{j}_{\mathrm m} \\ \end{align}$$	$$\begin{align} \Box \varphi_{\mathrm e} =& -\frac{\rho_{\mathrm e}}{\varepsilon_0} \\ \Box \mathbf{A}_{\mathrm e} =& -\mu_0 \mathbf{j}_{\mathrm e} \\ \Box \varphi_{\mathrm m} =& -\rho_{\mathrm m} \\ \Box \mathbf{A}_{\mathrm m} =& -\frac{\mathbf{j}_{\mathrm m}}{c^2} \\ \end{align}$$
Lorenz gauge condition	$$\begin{align} &\frac{1}{c}\frac{\partial}{\partial t}\varphi_{\mathrm e} + \nabla \cdot \mathbf{A}_{\mathrm e} = 0 \\ &\frac{1}{c}\frac{\partial}{\partial t}\varphi_{\mathrm m} + \nabla \cdot \mathbf{A}_{\mathrm m} = 0 \\ \end{align}$$	$$\begin{align} &\frac{1}{c^2}\frac{\partial}{\partial t}\varphi_{\mathrm e} + \nabla \cdot \mathbf{A}_{\mathrm e} = 0 \\ &\frac{1}{c^2}\frac{\partial}{\partial t}\varphi_{\mathrm m} + \nabla \cdot \mathbf{A}_{\mathrm m} = 0 \\ \end{align}$$	
Relation to fields	$$\begin{align} \mathbf{E} =& -\nabla \varphi_{\mathrm e} - \frac{1}{c}\frac{\partial \mathbf{A}_{\mathrm e}}{\partial t} - \nabla \times \mathbf{A}_{\mathrm m} \\ \mathbf{B} =& -\nabla \varphi_{\mathrm m} - \frac{1}{c}\frac{\partial \mathbf{A}_{\mathrm m}}{\partial t} + \nabla \times \mathbf{A}_{\mathrm e} \\ \end{align}$$	$$\begin{align} \mathbf{E} =& -\nabla \varphi_{\mathrm e} - \frac{\partial \mathbf{A}_{\mathrm e}}{\partial t} - \frac{1}{\varepsilon_0} \nabla \times \mathbf{A}_{\mathrm m} \\ \mathbf{B} =& -\mu_0 \nabla \varphi_{\mathrm m} - \mu_0\frac{\partial \mathbf{A}_{\mathrm m}}{\partial t} + \nabla \times \mathbf{A}_{\mathrm e} \\ \end{align}$$	

where

$$\Box = \nabla^2 - \frac{1}{c^2}\frac{\partial^2}{{\partial t}^2}$$

=== Tensor formulation ===
Maxwell's equations in the language of tensors makes Lorentz covariance clear. We introduce electromagnetic tensors and preliminary four-vectors in this article as follows:

Name	Notation	Gaussian units	SI units (Wb or A⋅m)
Electromagnetic tensor	$F^{\alpha\beta} = (F^{01}, F^{02}, F^{03},\; F^{23}, F^{31}, F^{12})$	$(-\mathbf{E},\; -\mathbf{B})$	$(-\mathbf{E}/c,\; -\mathbf{B})$
Dual electromagnetic tensor	${\tilde F}^{\alpha\beta} = ({\tilde F}^{01}, {\tilde F}^{02}, {\tilde F}^{03},\; {\tilde F}^{23}, {\tilde F}^{31}, {\tilde F}^{12})$	$(-\mathbf{B},\; \mathbf{E})$	$(-\mathbf{B},\; \mathbf{E}/c)$
Four-current	$J^\alpha_{\mathrm e} = (J^0_{\mathrm e}, J^1_{\mathrm e}, J^2_{\mathrm e}, J^3_{\mathrm e})$	$(c\rho_{\mathrm e},\; \mathbf{j}_{\mathrm e})$	
Four-current	$J^\alpha_{\mathrm m} = (J^0_{\mathrm m}, J^1_{\mathrm m}, J^2_{\mathrm m}, J^3_{\mathrm m})$	$(c\rho_{\mathrm m},\; \mathbf{j}_{\mathrm m})$	
Four-potential	$A^\alpha_{\mathrm e} = (A^0_{\mathrm e}, A^1_{\mathrm e}, A^2_{\mathrm e}, A^3_{\mathrm e})$	$(\varphi_{\mathrm e}, \mathbf{A}_{\mathrm e})$	$(\varphi_{\mathrm e}/c,\; \mathbf{A}_{\mathrm e})$
Four-potential	$A^\alpha_{\mathrm m} = (A^0_{\mathrm m}, A^1_{\mathrm m}, A^2_{\mathrm m}, A^3_{\mathrm m})$	$(\varphi_{\mathrm m}, \mathbf{A}_{\mathrm m})$	$(\varphi_{\mathrm m}/c,\; \mathbf{A}_{\mathrm m})$
Four-force	$f_\alpha = (f_0, f_1, f_2, f_3)$	$\frac{1}{\sqrt{1-v^2/c^2}} (\mathbf{F}\cdot\mathbf{v},\; -\mathbf{F})$	

where:

- The signature of the Minkowski metric is (+ − − −).
- The electromagnetic tensor and its Hodge dual are antisymmetric tensors:
  $$F^{\alpha\beta} = -F^{\beta\alpha},\quad {\tilde F}^{\alpha\beta} = -{\tilde F}^{\beta\alpha}$$

The generalized equations are:

Maxwell equations	Gaussian units	SI units (Wb)	SI units (A⋅m)
Ampère–Gauss law	$\partial_\alpha F^{\alpha\beta} = \frac{4\pi}{c}J^\beta_{\mathrm e}$	$\partial_\alpha F^{\alpha\beta} = \mu_0 J^\beta_{\mathrm e}$	
Faraday–Gauss law	$\partial_\alpha {\tilde F^{\alpha\beta}} = \frac{4\pi}{c} J^\beta_{\mathrm m}$	$\partial_\alpha {\tilde F^{\alpha\beta}} = \frac{1}{c} J^\beta_{\mathrm m}$	$\partial_\alpha {\tilde F^{\alpha\beta}} = \frac{\mu_0}{c} J^\beta_{\mathrm m}$
Lorentz force law	$f_\alpha = \left[ q_{\mathrm e} F_{\alpha\beta} + q_{\mathrm m} {\tilde F_{\alpha\beta}} \right] \frac{v^\beta}{c}$	$f_\alpha = \left[ q_{\mathrm e} F_{\alpha\beta} + \frac{q_{\mathrm m}}{\mu_0 c} {\tilde F_{\alpha\beta}} \right] v^\beta$	$f_\alpha = \left[ q_{\mathrm e} F_{\alpha\beta} + \frac{q_{\mathrm m}}{c} {\tilde F_{\alpha\beta}} \right] v^\beta$

Alternatively,

Name	Gaussian units	SI units (Wb)	SI units (A⋅m)
Maxwell's equations	$\partial^\alpha \partial_\alpha A^\beta_{\mathrm e} - \partial^\beta \partial_\alpha A^\alpha_{\mathrm e} = \frac{4\pi}{c}J^\beta_{\mathrm e}$	$\partial^\alpha \partial_\alpha A^\beta_{\mathrm e} - \partial^\beta \partial_\alpha A^\alpha_{\mathrm e} = \mu_0 J^\beta_{\mathrm e}$	
Maxwell's equations	$\partial^\alpha \partial_\alpha A^\beta_{\mathrm m} - \partial^\beta \partial_\alpha A^\alpha_{\mathrm m} = \frac{4\pi}{c}J^\beta_{\mathrm m}$	$\partial^\alpha \partial_\alpha A^\beta_{\mathrm m} - \partial^\beta \partial_\alpha A^\alpha_{\mathrm m} = \varepsilon_0 J^\beta_{\mathrm m}$	$\cdots = \frac{1}{c^2} J^\beta_{\mathrm m}$
Lorenz gauge condition	$\partial_\alpha A^\alpha_{\mathrm e} = 0,\quad \partial_\alpha A^\alpha_{\mathrm m} = 0$		
Relation to fields (Cabibbo–Ferrari-Shanmugadhasan relation)	$F^{\alpha\beta} = \partial^\alpha A_{\mathrm e}^\beta - \partial^\beta A_{\mathrm e}^\alpha - \varepsilon^{\alpha\beta\mu\nu} \partial_\mu A_{{\mathrm m}\nu}$ ${\tilde F}^{\alpha\beta} = \partial^\alpha A_{\mathrm m}^\beta - \partial^\beta A_{\mathrm m}^\alpha + \varepsilon^{\alpha\beta\mu\nu}\partial_\mu A_{{\mathrm e}\nu}$	$F^{\alpha\beta} = \partial^\alpha A_{\mathrm e}^\beta - \partial^\beta A_{\mathrm e}^\alpha - \mu_0 c \varepsilon^{\alpha\beta\mu\nu} \partial_\mu A_{{\mathrm m}\nu}$ ${\tilde F}^{\alpha\beta} = \mu_0 c (\partial^\alpha A_{\mathrm m}^\beta - \partial^\beta A_{\mathrm m}^\alpha) + \varepsilon^{\alpha\beta\mu\nu}\partial_\mu A_{{\mathrm e}\nu}$	

where the ε^{αβμν} is the Levi-Civita symbol.

=== Duality transformation ===
The generalized Maxwell's equations possess a certain symmetry, called a duality transformation. One can choose any real angle ξ, and simultaneously change the fields and charges everywhere in the universe as follows (in Gaussian units):

Charges and Currents	Fields
$$\begin{pmatrix} \rho_{\mathrm e} \\ \rho_{\mathrm m} \end{pmatrix}=\begin{pmatrix} \cos \xi & -\sin \xi \\ \sin \xi & \cos \xi \\ \end{pmatrix}\begin{pmatrix} \rho_{\mathrm e}' \\ \rho_{\mathrm m}' \end{pmatrix}$$	$$\begin{pmatrix} \mathbf{E} \\ \mathbf{H} \end{pmatrix}=\begin{pmatrix} \cos \xi & -\sin \xi \\ \sin \xi & \cos \xi \\ \end{pmatrix}\begin{pmatrix} \mathbf{E'} \\ \mathbf{H'} \end{pmatrix}$$
$$\begin{pmatrix} \mathbf{J}_{\mathrm e} \\ \mathbf{J}_{\mathrm m} \end{pmatrix}=\begin{pmatrix} \cos \xi & -\sin \xi \\ \sin \xi & \cos \xi \\ \end{pmatrix}\begin{pmatrix} \mathbf{J}_{\mathrm e}' \\ \mathbf{J}_{\mathrm m}' \end{pmatrix}$$	$$\begin{pmatrix} \mathbf{D} \\ \mathbf{B} \end{pmatrix}=\begin{pmatrix} \cos \xi & -\sin \xi \\ \sin \xi & \cos \xi \\ \end{pmatrix}\begin{pmatrix} \mathbf{D'} \\ \mathbf{B'} \end{pmatrix}$$

where the primed quantities are the charges and fields before the transformation, and the unprimed quantities are after the transformation. The fields and charges after this transformation still obey the same Maxwell's equations.

Because of the duality transformation, one cannot uniquely decide whether a particle has an electric charge, a magnetic charge, or both, just by observing its behavior and comparing that to Maxwell's equations. For example, it is merely a convention, not a requirement of Maxwell's equations, that electrons have electric charge but not magnetic charge; after a ξ = π/2 transformation, it would be the other way around. The key empirical fact is that all particles ever observed have the same ratio of magnetic charge to electric charge. Duality transformations can change the ratio to any arbitrary numerical value, but cannot change that all particles have the same ratio. Since this is the case, a duality transformation can be made that sets this ratio at zero, so that all particles have no magnetic charge. This choice underlies the "conventional" definitions of electricity and magnetism.

== Dirac's quantization ==
One of the defining advances in quantum theory was Paul Dirac's work on developing a relativistic quantum electromagnetism. Before his formulation, the presence of electric charge was simply inserted into the equations of quantum mechanics (QM), but in 1931 Dirac showed that a discrete charge is implied by QM. That is to say, we can maintain the form of Maxwell's equations and still have magnetic charges.

Consider a system consisting of a single stationary electric monopole (i.e., an electron) and a single stationary magnetic monopole, which would not exert any forces on each other. Classically, the electromagnetic field surrounding them has a momentum density given by the Poynting vector, and it also has a total angular momentum, which is proportional to the product $q_\text{e} q_\text{m}$ and is independent of the distance between them.

Quantum mechanics dictates, however, that angular momentum is quantized as a multiple of $\hbar$, so therefore the product $q_\text{e} q_\text{m}$ must also be quantized. This means that if magnetic monopoles do exist in nature, and the form of Maxwell's equations is valid, then electric charge is quantized.

Although it would be possible simply to integrate over all space to find the total angular momentum in the above example, Dirac took a different approach. This led him to new ideas: He considered a point-like magnetic charge located at the origin whose magnetic field behaves as $q_\text{m} / r^2$ and is directed in the radial direction. Because the divergence of $\mathbf{B}$ is equal to zero everywhere except for the locus of the magnetic monopole at $r = 0$, one can locally define the vector potential such that the curl of the vector potential $\mathbf{A}$ equals the magnetic field $\mathbf{B}$.

However, the vector potential cannot be defined globally precisely because the divergence of the magnetic field is proportional to the Dirac delta function at the origin. We must define one set of functions for the vector potential on the "northern hemisphere" (the half-space $z > 0$ above the particle), and another set of functions for the "southern hemisphere". These two vector potentials are matched at the "equator" (the plane $z = 0$ through the particle), and they differ by a gauge transformation. The wave function of an electrically charged particle (a "probe charge") that orbits the "equator" generally changes by a phase, much like in the Aharonov–Bohm effect. This phase is proportional to the electric charge $q_\text{e}$ of the probe, as well as to the magnetic charge $q_\text{m}$ of the source. Dirac was originally considering an electron whose wave function is described by the Dirac equation.

Because the electron returns to the same point after a full trip around the equator, the phase $\phi$ of its wave function $\mathrm{e}^{i \phi}$ must be unchanged, which implies that the phase added to the wave function must be a multiple of 2π. This is known as the Dirac quantization condition. In various units, this condition can be expressed as:

Units	Condition
SI units (weber convention)	$\frac{q_\text{e} q_\text{m}}{2 \pi \hbar} \in \mathbb{Z}$
SI units (ampere-meter convention)	$\frac{q_\text{e} q_\text{m}}{2 \pi \varepsilon_0 \hbar c^2} \in \mathbb{Z}$
Gaussian-cgs units	$2 \frac{q_\text{e} q_\text{m}}{\hbar c} \in \mathbb{Z}$

where $\varepsilon_0$ is the vacuum permittivity, $\hbar = h / 2 \pi$ is the reduced Planck constant, $c$ is the speed of light in vacuum, and $\mathbb{Z}$ is the set of integers.

The hypothetical existence of a magnetic monopole would imply that electric charge must be quantized in certain units; conversely, the existence of electric charge implies that the magnetic charge of the hypothetical magnetic monopole (if it exists) must be quantized in units inversely proportional to the elementary electric charge.

In 1931 it was not clear if such a thing existed, or even had to. After all, another theory could come along that would explain charge quantization without need for the magnetic monopole. The concept remained something of a curiosity. However, in the time since the publication of this seminal work, no other widely accepted explanation of charge quantization has appeared. (The concept of local gauge invariance—see gauge theory—provides a natural explanation of charge quantization, without invoking the need for magnetic monopoles; but only if the U(1) gauge group is compact, in which case we have magnetic monopoles anyway.)

If we maximally extend the definition of the vector potential for the southern hemisphere, it is defined everywhere except for a semi-infinite line stretched from the origin in the direction towards the northern pole. This semi-infinite line is called the Dirac string and its effect on the wave function is analogous to the effect of the solenoid in the Aharonov–Bohm effect. The quantization condition comes from the requirement that the phases around the Dirac string are trivial, which means that the Dirac string must be unphysical. In other words, the Dirac string is merely an artifact of the coordinate system and therefore should not be taken to have physical meaning.

In summary, the Dirac monopole is a singular solution of Maxwell's equation (because it requires removing the world line from spacetime); in more sophisticated theories, it is superseded by a smooth solution such as the 't Hooft–Polyakov monopole.

== Topological interpretation ==
=== Dirac string ===
A gauge theory like electromagnetism is defined by a gauge field, which associates a group element to each path in space time. For infinitesimal paths, the group element is close to the identity, while for longer paths the group element is the successive product of the infinitesimal group elements along the way.

In electrodynamics, the group is U(1), unit complex numbers under multiplication. For infinitesimal paths, the group element is 1 + iA_{μ}dx^{μ} which implies that for finite paths parametrized by s, the group element is:

$\prod_s \left( 1+ieA_\mu {dx^\mu \over ds} \, ds \right) = \exp \left( ie\int A\cdot dx \right) .$

The map from paths to group elements is called the Wilson loop or the holonomy, and for a U(1) gauge group it is the phase factor which the wavefunction of a charged particle acquires as it traverses the path. For a loop:

$e \oint_{\partial D} A\cdot dx = e \int_D (\nabla \times A) \, dS = e \int_D B \, dS.$

So that the phase a charged particle gets when going in a loop is the magnetic flux through the loop. When a small solenoid has a magnetic flux, there are interference fringes for charged particles which go around the solenoid, or around different sides of the solenoid, which reveal its presence.

But if all particle charges are integer multiples of e, solenoids with a flux of 2π/e have no interference fringes, because the phase factor for any charged particle is exp(2πi) = 1. Such a solenoid, if thin enough, is quantum-mechanically invisible. If such a solenoid were to carry a flux of 2π/e, when the flux leaked out from one of its ends it would be indistinguishable from a monopole.

Dirac's monopole solution in fact describes an infinitesimal line solenoid ending at a point, and the location of the solenoid is the singular part of the solution, the Dirac string. Dirac strings link monopoles and antimonopoles of opposite magnetic charge, although in Dirac's version, the string just goes off to infinity. The string is unobservable, so you can put it anywhere, and by using two coordinate patches, the field in each patch can be made nonsingular by sliding the string to where it cannot be seen.

=== Grand unified theories ===
In a U(1) gauge group with quantized charge, the group is a circle of radius 2π/e. Such a U(1) gauge group is called compact. Any U(1) that comes from a grand unified theory (GUT) is compact – because only compact higher gauge groups make sense. The size of the gauge group is a measure of the inverse coupling constant, so that in the limit of a large-volume gauge group, the interaction of any fixed representation goes to zero.

The case of the U(1) gauge group is a special case because all its irreducible representations are of the same size – the charge is bigger by an integer amount, but the field is still just a complex number – so that in U(1) gauge field theory it is possible to take the decompactified limit with no contradiction. The quantum of charge becomes small, but each charged particle has a huge number of charge quanta so its charge stays finite. In a non-compact U(1) gauge group theory, the charges of particles are generically not integer multiples of a single unit. Since charge quantization is an experimental certainty, it is clear that the U(1) gauge group of electromagnetism is compact.

GUTs lead to compact U(1) gauge groups, so they explain charge quantization in a way that seems logically independent from magnetic monopoles. However, the explanation is essentially the same, because in any GUT that breaks down into a U(1) gauge group at long distances, there are magnetic monopoles.

The argument is topological:

1. The holonomy of a gauge field maps loops to elements of the gauge group. Infinitesimal loops are mapped to group elements infinitesimally close to the identity.
2. If you imagine a big sphere in space, you can deform an infinitesimal loop that starts and ends at the north pole as follows: stretch out the loop over the western hemisphere until it becomes a great circle (which still starts and ends at the north pole) then let it shrink back to a little loop while going over the eastern hemisphere. This is called lassoing the sphere.
3. Lassoing is a sequence of loops, so the holonomy maps it to a sequence of group elements, a continuous path in the gauge group. Since the loop at the beginning of the lassoing is the same as the loop at the end, the path in the group is closed.
4. If the group path associated to the lassoing procedure winds around the U(1), the sphere contains magnetic charge. During the lassoing, the holonomy changes by the amount of magnetic flux through the sphere.
5. Since the holonomy at the beginning and at the end is the identity, the total magnetic flux is quantized. The magnetic charge is proportional to the number of windings N, the magnetic flux through the sphere is equal to 2πN/e. This is the Dirac quantization condition, and it is a topological condition that demands that the long distance U(1) gauge field configurations be consistent.
6. When the U(1) gauge group comes from breaking a compact Lie group, the path that winds around the U(1) group enough times is topologically trivial in the big group. In a non-U(1) compact Lie group, the covering space is a Lie group with the same Lie algebra, but where all closed loops are contractible. Lie groups are homogeneous, so that any cycle in the group can be moved around so that it starts at the identity, then its lift to the covering group ends at P, which is a lift of the identity. Going around the loop twice gets you to P^{2}, three times to P^{3}, all lifts of the identity. But there are only finitely many lifts of the identity, because the lifts can't accumulate. This number of times one has to traverse the loop to make it contractible is small, for example if the GUT group is SO(3), the covering group is SU(2), and going around any loop twice is enough.
7. This means that there is a continuous gauge-field configuration in the GUT group allows the U(1) monopole configuration to unwind itself at short distances, at the cost of not staying in the U(1). To do this with as little energy as possible, you should leave only the U(1) gauge group in the neighborhood of one point, which is called the core of the monopole. Outside the core, the monopole has only magnetic field energy.

Hence, the Dirac monopole is a topological defect in a compact U(1) gauge theory. When there is no GUT, the defect is a singularity – the core shrinks to a point. But when there is some sort of short-distance regulator on spacetime, the monopoles have a finite mass. Monopoles occur in lattice U(1), and there the core size is the lattice size. In general, they are expected to occur whenever there is a short-distance regulator.

=== String theory ===
In the universe, quantum gravity provides the regulator. When gravity is included, the monopole singularity can be a black hole, and for large magnetic charge and mass, the black hole mass is equal to the black hole charge, so that the mass of the magnetic black hole is not infinite. If the black hole can decay completely by Hawking radiation, the lightest charged particles cannot be too heavy. The lightest monopole should have a mass less than or comparable to its charge in natural units.

So in a consistent holographic theory, of which string theory is the only known example, there are always finite-mass monopoles. For ordinary electromagnetism, the upper mass bound is not very useful because it is about same size as the Planck mass.

=== Mathematical formulation ===
In mathematics, a (classical) gauge field is defined as a connection over a principal G-bundle over spacetime. G is the gauge group, and it acts on each fiber of the bundle separately.

A connection on a G-bundle tells you how to glue fibers together at nearby points of M. It starts with a continuous symmetry group G that acts on the fiber F, and then it associates a group element with each infinitesimal path. Group multiplication along any path tells you how to move from one point on the bundle to another, by having the G element associated to a path act on the fiber F.

In mathematics, the definition of bundle is designed to emphasize topology, so the notion of connection is added on as an afterthought. In physics, the connection is the fundamental physical object. One of the fundamental observations in the theory of characteristic classes in algebraic topology is that many homotopical structures of nontrivial principal bundles may be expressed as an integral of some polynomial over any connection over it. Note that a connection over a trivial bundle can never give us a nontrivial principal bundle.

If spacetime is $\mathbb{R}^4$ the space of all possible connections of the G-bundle is connected. But consider what happens when we remove a timelike worldline from spacetime. The resulting spacetime is homotopically equivalent to the topological sphere S^{2}.

A principal G-bundle over S^{2} is defined by covering S^{2} by two charts, each homeomorphic to the open 2-ball such that their intersection is homeomorphic to the strip S^{1}×I. 2-balls are homotopically trivial and the strip is homotopically equivalent to the circle S^{1}. So a topological classification of the possible connections is reduced to classifying the transition functions. The transition function maps the strip to G, and the different ways of mapping a strip into G are given by the first homotopy group of G.

So in the G-bundle formulation, a gauge theory admits Dirac monopoles provided G is not simply connected, whenever there are paths that go around the group that cannot be deformed to a constant path (a path whose image consists of a single point). U(1), which has quantized charges, is not simply connected and can have Dirac monopoles while $\mathbb{R}$, its universal covering group, is simply connected, doesn't have quantized charges and does not admit Dirac monopoles. The mathematical definition is equivalent to the physics definition provided that—following Dirac—gauge fields are allowed that are defined only patch-wise, and the gauge field on different patches are glued after a gauge transformation.

The total magnetic flux is none other than the first Chern number of the principal bundle, and depends only upon the choice of the principal bundle, and not the specific connection over it. In other words, it is a topological invariant.

This argument for monopoles is a restatement of the lasso argument for a pure U(1) theory. It generalizes to d + 1 dimensions with d ≥ 2 in several ways. One way is to extend everything into the extra dimensions, so that U(1) monopoles become sheets of dimension d − 3. Another way is to examine the type of topological singularity at a point with the homotopy group π_{d−2}(G).

== Grand unified theories ==
In more recent years, a new class of theories has also suggested the existence of magnetic monopoles.

During the early 1970s, the successes of quantum field theory and gauge theory in the development of electroweak theory and the mathematics of the strong nuclear force led many theorists to move on to attempt to combine them in a single theory known as a Grand Unified Theory (GUT). Several GUTs were proposed, most of which implied the presence of a real magnetic monopole particle. More accurately, GUTs predicted a range of particles known as dyons, of which the most basic state was a monopole. The charge on magnetic monopoles predicted by GUTs is either 1 or 2 gD, depending on the theory.

The majority of particles appearing in any quantum field theory are unstable, and they decay into other particles in a variety of reactions that must satisfy various conservation laws. Stable particles are stable because there are no lighter particles into which they can decay and still satisfy the conservation laws. For instance, the electron has a lepton number of one and an electric charge of one, and there are no lighter particles that conserve these values. On the other hand, the muon, essentially a heavy electron, can decay into the electron plus two quanta of energy, and hence it is not stable.

The dyons in these GUTs are also stable, but for an entirely different reason. The dyons are expected to exist as a side effect of the "freezing out" of the conditions of the early universe, or a symmetry breaking. In this scenario, the dyons arise due to the configuration of the vacuum in a particular area of the universe, according to the original Dirac theory. They remain stable not because of a conservation condition, but because there is no simpler topological state into which they can decay.

The length scale over which this special vacuum configuration exists is called the correlation length of the system. A correlation length cannot be larger than causality would allow, therefore the correlation length for making magnetic monopoles must be at least as big as the horizon size determined by the metric of the expanding universe. According to that logic, there should be at least one magnetic monopole per horizon volume as it was when the symmetry breaking took place.

Cosmological models of the events following the Big Bang make predictions about what the horizon volume was, which lead to predictions about present-day monopole density. Early models predicted an enormous density of monopoles, in clear contradiction to the experimental evidence. This was called the "monopole problem". Its widely accepted resolution was not a change in the particle-physics prediction of monopoles, but rather in the cosmological models used to infer their present-day density. Specifically, more recent theories of cosmic inflation drastically reduce the predicted number of magnetic monopoles, to a density small enough to make it unsurprising that humans have never seen one. This resolution of the "monopole problem" was regarded as a success of cosmic inflation theory. (However, of course, it is only a noteworthy success if the particle-physics monopole prediction is correct.) For these reasons, monopoles became a major interest in the 1970s and 80s, along with the other "approachable" predictions of GUTs such as proton decay.

Many of the other particles predicted by these GUTs were beyond the abilities of current experiments to detect. For instance, a wide class of particles known as the X and Y bosons are predicted to mediate the coupling of the electroweak and strong forces, but these particles are extremely heavy and well beyond the capabilities of any reasonable particle accelerator to create.

== Searches for magnetic monopoles ==
Experimental searches for magnetic monopoles can be placed in one of two categories: those that try to detect preexisting magnetic monopoles and those that try to create and detect new magnetic monopoles.

Passing a magnetic monopole through a coil of wire induces a net current in the coil. This is not the case for a magnetic dipole or higher order magnetic pole, for which the net induced current is zero, and hence the effect can be used as an unambiguous test for the presence of magnetic monopoles. In a wire with finite resistance, the induced current quickly dissipates its energy as heat, but in a superconducting loop the induced current is long-lived. By using a highly sensitive "superconducting quantum interference device" (SQUID) one can, in principle, detect even a single magnetic monopole.

According to standard inflationary cosmology, magnetic monopoles produced before inflation would have been diluted to an extremely low density today. Magnetic monopoles may also have been produced thermally after inflation, during the period of reheating. However, the current bounds on the reheating temperature span 18 orders of magnitude and as a consequence the density of magnetic monopoles today is not well constrained by theory.

There have been many searches for preexisting magnetic monopoles. Although there has been one tantalizing event recorded, by Blas Cabrera Navarro on the night of February 14, 1982 (thus, sometimes referred to as the "Valentine's Day Monopole"), there has never been reproducible evidence for the existence of magnetic monopoles. The lack of such events places an upper limit on the number of monopoles of about one monopole per 10^{29} nucleons.

Another experiment in 1975 resulted in the announcement of the detection of a moving magnetic monopole in cosmic rays by the team led by P. Buford Price. Price later retracted his claim, and a possible alternative explanation was offered by Luis Walter Alvarez. In his paper it was demonstrated that the path of the cosmic ray event that was claimed due to a magnetic monopole could be reproduced by the path followed by a platinum nucleus decaying first to osmium, and then to tantalum.

High-energy particle colliders have been used to try to create magnetic monopoles. Due to the conservation of magnetic charge, magnetic monopoles must be created in pairs, one north and one south. Due to conservation of energy, only magnetic monopoles with masses less than half of the center of mass energy of the colliding particles can be produced. Beyond this, very little is known theoretically about the creation of magnetic monopoles in high-energy particle collisions. This is due to their large magnetic charge, which invalidates all the usual calculational techniques. As a consequence, collider-based searches for magnetic monopoles cannot, as yet, provide lower bounds on the mass of magnetic monopoles. They can however provide upper bounds on the probability (or cross section) of pair production, as a function of energy.

The ATLAS experiment at the Large Hadron Collider currently has the most stringent cross section limits for magnetic monopoles of 1 and 2 Dirac charges, produced through Drell–Yan pair production. A team led by Wendy Taylor searches for these particles based on theories that define them as long lived (they do not quickly decay), as well as being highly ionizing (their interaction with matter is predominantly ionizing). In 2019 the search for magnetic monopoles in the ATLAS detector reported its first results from data collected from the LHC Run 2 collisions at center of mass energy of 13 TeV, which at 34.4 fb^{−1} is the largest dataset analyzed to date.

The MoEDAL experiment, installed at the Large Hadron Collider, is currently searching for magnetic monopoles and large supersymmetric particles using nuclear track detectors and aluminum bars around LHCb's VELO detector. The particles it is looking for damage the plastic sheets that comprise the nuclear track detectors along their path, with various identifying features. Further, the aluminum bars can trap sufficiently slowly moving magnetic monopoles. The bars can then be analyzed by passing them through a SQUID.

== "Monopoles" in condensed-matter systems ==
Since around 2003, various condensed-matter physics groups have used the term "magnetic monopole" to describe a different and largely unrelated phenomenon.

A true magnetic monopole would be a new elementary particle, and would violate Gauss's law for magnetism ∇⋅B = 0. A monopole of this kind, which would help to explain the law of charge quantization as formulated by Paul Dirac in 1931, has never been observed in experiments.

The monopoles studied by condensed-matter groups have none of these properties. They are not a new elementary particle, but rather are an emergent phenomenon in systems of everyday particles (protons, neutrons, electrons, photons); in other words, they are quasi-particles. They are not sources for the B-field (i.e., they do not violate ∇⋅B = 0); instead, they are sources for other fields, for example the H-field, the "B*-field" (related to superfluid vorticity), or various other quantum fields. They are not directly relevant to grand unified theories or other aspects of particle physics, and do not help explain charge quantization—except insofar as studies of analogous situations can help confirm that the mathematical analyses involved are sound.

There are a number of examples in condensed-matter physics where collective behavior leads to emergent phenomena that resemble magnetic monopoles in certain respects, including most prominently the spin ice materials. While these should not be confused with hypothetical elementary monopoles existing in the vacuum, they nonetheless have similar properties and can be probed using similar techniques.

Some researchers use the term magnetricity to describe the manipulation of magnetic monopole quasiparticles in spin ice, in analogy to the word "electricity".

One example of the work on magnetic monopole quasiparticles is a paper published in the journal Science in September 2009, in which researchers described the observation of quasiparticles resembling magnetic monopoles. A single crystal of the spin ice material dysprosium titanate was cooled to a temperature between 0.6 kelvin and 2.0 kelvin. Using observations of neutron scattering, the magnetic moments were shown to align into interwoven tubelike bundles resembling Dirac strings. At the defect formed by the end of each tube, the magnetic field looks like that of a monopole. Using an applied magnetic field to break the symmetry of the system, the researchers were able to control the density and orientation of these strings. A contribution to the heat capacity of the system from an effective gas of these quasiparticles was also described. This research went on to win the 2012 Europhysics Prize for condensed matter physics.

In another example, a paper in the February 11, 2011, issue of Nature Physics describes creation and measurement of long-lived magnetic monopole quasiparticle currents in spin ice. By applying a magnetic-field pulse to crystal of dysprosium titanate at 0.36 K, the authors created a relaxing magnetic current that lasted for several minutes. They measured the current by means of the electromotive force it induced in a solenoid coupled to a sensitive amplifier, and quantitatively described it using a chemical kinetic model of point-like charges obeying the Onsager–Wien mechanism of carrier dissociation and recombination. They thus derived the microscopic parameters of monopole motion in spin ice and identified the distinct roles of free and bound magnetic charges.

In superfluids, there is a field B*, related to superfluid vorticity, which is mathematically analogous to the magnetic B-field. Because of the similarity, the field B* is called a "synthetic magnetic field". In January 2014, it was reported that monopole quasiparticles for the B* field were created and studied in a spinor Bose–Einstein condensate. This constitutes the first example of a quasi-magnetic monopole observed within a system governed by quantum field theory.`

Updates to the theoretical and experimental searches in matter can be found in the reports by G. Giacomelli (2000) and by S. Balestra (2011) in the Bibliography section.

== See also ==
- Bogomolny equations
- Dirac string
- Dyon
- Felix Ehrenhaft
- Flatness problem
- Gauss's law for magnetism
- Ginzburg–Landau theory
- Halbach array
- Horizon problem
- Instanton
- Magnetic monopole problem
- Meron
- Soliton
- 't Hooft–Polyakov monopole
- Wu–Yang monopole
- Magnetic current
