= Dirac string =

Unobservable spacetime curves needed to describe Dirac monopoles

In physics, a Dirac string is a one-dimensional curve in space, conceived of by the physicist Paul Dirac, stretching between two hypothetical Dirac monopoles with opposite magnetic charges, or from one magnetic monopole out to infinity. The gauge potential cannot be defined on the Dirac string, but it is defined everywhere else. The Dirac string acts as the solenoid in the Aharonov–Bohm effect, and the requirement that the position of the Dirac string should not be observable implies the Dirac quantization rule: the product of a magnetic charge and an electric charge must always be an integer multiple of $2\pi\hbar$. Also, a change of position of a Dirac string corresponds to a gauge transformation. This shows that Dirac strings are not gauge invariant, which is consistent with the fact that they are not observable.

The Dirac string is the only way to incorporate magnetic monopoles into Maxwell's equations, since the magnetic flux running along the interior of the string maintains their validity. If Maxwell equations are modified to allow magnetic charges at the fundamental level then the magnetic monopoles are no longer Dirac monopoles, and do not require attached Dirac strings.

== Details ==
The quantization forced by the Dirac string can be understood in terms of the cohomology of the fibre bundle representing the gauge fields over the base manifold of space-time. The magnetic charges of a gauge field theory can be understood to be the group generators of the cohomology group $H^2(M)$ for the fiber bundle M. The cohomology arises from the idea of classifying all possible gauge field strengths $F=dA$, which are manifestly exact forms, modulo all possible gauge transformations, given that the field strength F must be a closed form: $dF=0$. Here, A is the vector potential and d represents the gauge-covariant derivative, and F the field strength or curvature form on the fiber bundle. Informally, one might say that the Dirac string carries away the "excess curvature" that would otherwise prevent F from being a closed form, as one has that $dF=0$ everywhere except at the location of the monopole.
