= Dyon =

Hypothetical particle in physics

In physics, a dyon is a hypothetical particle in 4-dimensional theories with both electric and magnetic charges. A dyon with a zero electric charge is usually referred to as a magnetic monopole. Many Grand Unified Theories predict the existence of both magnetic monopoles and dyons.

Dyons were first proposed by Julian Schwinger in 1969 as a phenomenological alternative to quarks. He extended the Dirac quantization condition to the dyon and used the model to predict the existence of a particle with the properties of the J/ψ meson prior to its discovery in 1974.

The allowed charges of dyons are restricted by the Dirac quantization condition. This states in particular that their magnetic charge must be integral, and that their electric charges must all be equal modulo 1. The Witten effect, demonstrated by Edward Witten in his 1979 paper, states that the electric charges of dyons must all be equal, modulo one, to the product of their magnetic charge and the theta angle of the theory. In particular, if a theory preserves CP symmetry then the electric charges of all dyons are integers.
