= Magnetic current =

Flow of magnetic monopole charge

Magnetic current (flowing magnetic monopoles), M, creates an electric field, E, in accordance with the left-hand rule.

Magnetic current is, nominally, a current composed of moving magnetic monopoles. It has the unit volt. The usual symbol for magnetic current is $k$, which is analogous to $i$ for electric current. Magnetic currents produce an electric field analogously to the production of a magnetic field by electric currents. Magnetic current density, which has the unit V/m^{2} (volt per square meter), is usually represented by the symbols $\mathfrak{M}^\text{t}$ and $\mathfrak{M}^\text{i}$. (Note: Not to be confused with magnetization M) The superscripts indicate total and impressed magnetic current density. The impressed currents are the energy sources. In many useful cases, a distribution of electric charge can be mathematically replaced by an equivalent distribution of magnetic current. This artifice can be used to simplify some electromagnetic field problems. (Note: "For some electromagnetic problems, their solution can often be aided by the introduction of equivalent impressed electric and magnetic current densities.") (Note: "there are many other problems where the use of fictitious magnetic currents and charges is very helpful.") It is possible to use both electric current densities and magnetic current densities in the same analysis.

The direction of the electric field produced by magnetic currents is determined by the left-hand rule (opposite direction as determined by the right-hand rule) as evidenced by the negative sign in the equation $\nabla \times \mathcal{E} = -\mathfrak{M}^\text{t} .$

== Magnetic displacement current ==
Magnetic displacement current or more properly the magnetic displacement current density is the familiar term ∂B/∂t (Note: "Because of the symmetry of Maxwell's equations, the ∂B/∂t term ... has been designated as a magnetic displacement current density.") (Note: "interpreted as ... magnetic displacement current ...") (Note: "it also is convenient to consider the term ∂B/∂t as a magnetic displacement current density.") It is one component of $\mathfrak{M}^\text{t}$. $\mathfrak{M}^\text{t} = \frac {\partial B} {\partial t} + \mathfrak{M}^\text{i} .$ where

- $\mathfrak{M}^\text{t}$ is the total magnetic current.
- $\mathfrak{M}^\text{i}$ is the impressed magnetic current (energy source).

== Electric vector potential ==
The electric vector potential, F, is computed from the magnetic current density, $\mathfrak{M}^\text{i}$, in the same way that the magnetic vector potential, A, is computed from the electric current density. Examples of use include finite diameter wire antennas and transformers.

magnetic vector potential: $\mathbf A (\mathbf r , t) = \frac{\mu_0}{4\pi}\int_\Omega \frac{\mathbf J (\mathbf r' , t')}{|\mathbf r - \mathbf r'|}\, \mathrm{d}^3\mathbf r'\,.$

electric vector potential: $\mathbf F (\mathbf r , t) = \frac{\varepsilon_0}{4\pi}\int_\Omega \frac{\mathfrak{M}^\text{i} (\mathbf r' , t')}{|\mathbf r - \mathbf r'|}\, \mathrm{d}^3\mathbf r'\,,$ where F at point $\mathbf r$ and time $t$ is calculated from magnetic currents at distant position $\mathbf r'$ at an earlier time $t'$. The location $\mathbf r'$ is a source point within volume Ω that contains the magnetic current distribution. The integration variable, $\mathrm{d}^3\mathbf r'$, is a volume element around position $\mathbf r'$. The earlier time $t'$ is called the retarded time, and calculated as $t' = t - \frac{|\mathbf r - \mathbf r'|}{c}.$

Retarded time accounts for the accounts for the time required for electromagnetic effects to propagate from point $\mathbf r'$ to point $\mathbf r$.

=== Phasor form ===
When all the functions of time are sinusoids of the same frequency, the time domain equation can be replaced with a frequency domain equation. Retarded time is replaced with a phase term. $\mathbf F (\mathbf r ) = \frac{\varepsilon_0}{4\pi} \int_\Omega \frac{\mathfrak{M}^\text{i} (\mathbf{r}) e^{-jk |\mathbf{r} - \mathbf r'|}}{|\mathbf r - \mathbf r'|}\, \mathrm{d}^3\mathbf r'\,,$ where $\mathbf F$ and $\mathfrak{M}^\text{i}$ are phasor quantities and $k$ is the wave number.

== Magnetic frill generator ==
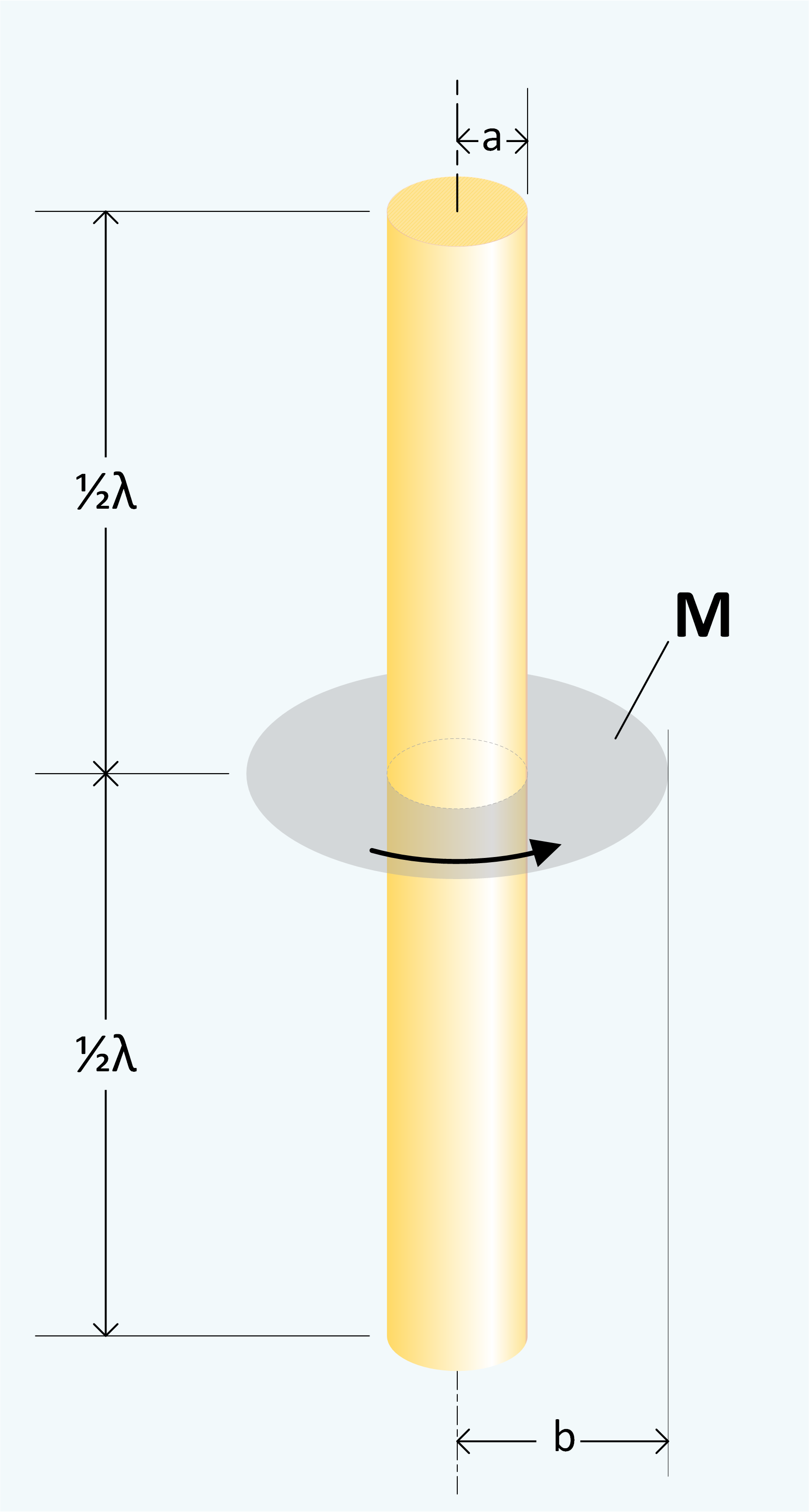
A dipole antenna driven by a hypothetical annular ring of magnetic current. b is chosen so that 377 Ω × ln(b/a) is equal to the impedance of the driving transmission line (not shown).

A distribution of magnetic current, commonly called a magnetic frill generator, may be used to replace the driving source and feed line in the analysis of a finite diameter dipole antenna. The voltage source and feed line impedance are subsumed into the magnetic current density. In this case, the magnetic current density is concentrated in a two dimensional surface so the units of $\mathfrak{M}^\text{i}$ are volts per meter.

The inner radius of the frill is the same as the radius of the dipole. The outer radius is chosen so that $Z_\text{L} = Z_0 \ln\left( \frac b a\right),$ where

- $Z_\text{L}$ = impedance of the feed transmission line (not shown).
- $Z_0$ = impedance of free space.

The equation is the same as the equation for the impedance of a coaxial cable. However, a coaxial cable feed line is not assumed and not required.

The amplitude of the magnetic current density phasor is given by: $\mathfrak{M}^\text{i} = \frac k \rho$ with $a \le \rho \le b.$ where

- $\rho$ = radial distance from the axis.
- $k = \frac {V_\text{s}} {\ln\left( \frac b a\right)}$.
- $V_\text{s}$ = magnitude of the source voltage phasor driving the feed line.

== See also ==
Surface equivalence principle
