= XYZ particle =

Class of exotic heavy mesons

In particle physics, XYZ particles (also referred to as XYZ states) are recently discovered heavy mesons whose properties do not appear to fit the standard picture of charmonium and bottomonium states. They are therefore types of exotic mesons. The term arises from the names given to some of the first such particles discovered: X(3872), Y(4260) and Z_{c}(3900), although the symbols X and Y have since been deprecated by the Particle Data Group.

== Theoretical significance ==
Since 2003 a frontier for the Standard Model (SM) has emerged at low energies through XYZ particle discoveries. The well-established theory of Quantum Chromodynamics (QCD) is tested by many exotic charmonium discoveries since the X(3872) was first identified at the Belle experiment in 2003. The basic model of hadron physics is the assembling of quarks into groups of 3 (baryons) or a quark and anti-quark pair (mesons). A meson with a charm quark and an anti-charm quark is called charmonium, and the same parallels with the bottom quark and bottomonium. More than two dozen previously unpredicted charmonium- and bottomonium-like states have been discovered, and the understanding of heavy quarkonium physics is undetermined. Previously postulated exotic Standard Model states might apply to these new unique particles. One proposed state is the hybrid state of a quark, anti-quark, and a gluon, sometimes mentioned with charm quarks as an excited charmonium. A multi-quark state of 4 or more quarks (tetraquark, pentaquark, etc.) is also proposed as well as a molecule-like state of multiple mesons. While each of these three types of states have had some success of explaining the newly discovered particle, a complete explanation has not been found.

== Types of particle ==
The first charmonium state with an unpredicted mass was X(3872). The Belle collaboration were searching for the B -> K π+ π- J/ψ decay when they discovered a peak in the π+ π- J/ψ invariant energy at 3872 with JCP quantum numbers of 1++. X(3872) was quickly confirmed by BaBar, CDF, and D0. The mass of X(3872) is close to the mass of DD* and makes it a candidate as a meson molecule or a possible tetraquark. In 2005 the BaBar collaboration found Y(4260) from Initial state radiation as well in π+ π- J/ψ production. Again a charmonium-like particle with a large coupling to final states without open charm mesons. Continued search shows a lack of an observation in the inclusive hadronic cross section. The BES III collaboration in 2012 started taking data at 4260 MeV and could observe direct production instead of B decay or Initial State Radiation to continue the study with a higher luminosity. The Z_{c}(3900) state was discovered at BESIII in 2013.

== See also ==
- Exotic meson
- Z(4430)
