= Sookyung Choi =

South Korean particle physicist

SooKyung Choi
- Education: Kyungpook National University
- Known for: CP Violation; Particle physics
- Awards: 2017 Ho-Am Prize in Science
- Scientific career
- Workplaces: Gyeongsang National University; Seoul National University

SooKyung Choi is a South Korean particle physicist at Gyeongsang National University. She is part of the Belle experiment and was the first to observe the X(3872) meson in 2003. She won the 2017 Ho-Am Prize in Science.

== Early life and education ==
Choi studied physics at the Kyungpook National University, graduating in 1979 with a Bachelor's degree and 1993 with a PhD. Her supervisors were Dongchul Son and C. Joo. After graduating, Choi joined Seoul National University, working on Møller and Bhabha scattering. She was appointed Professor at Gyeongsang National University, where she worked with the High Energy Accelerator Research Organization (KEK).

== Career ==
Choi's work mainly concerns CP violation and decays of the B meson. Choi worked on the Belle experiment, where she identified several new types of fundamental particles. The first results from Belle came in 2002, finding large cross-sections for the e^{+}e_{−}continuum. In 2003 she discovered the X(3872) meson; a new kind of heavy particle, which does not fit the quantum model as it was made up of four quarks. Choi predicted the X(3872) particle could be a charmonium state or a DD* hadronic molecule. The work was confirmed by a team at the Fermi National Accelerator Laboratory. Choi went on to discover the Y(3940), the Zc(3900) and Z(4430) particles, which proved that particles can exist in a range of forms. Choi studied the decays of these extensively.

She was involved with the study of other charmonium states; using the ϒ(4S) and ϒ(5S) resonances at the Belle detector. Choi has collaborated with the BES III experiment, which studied center of mass energies between 2.9 and 4.42 GeV. The BES III experiment identified new charmonium states with non-zero electric charge.

CP violation was first confirmed at the Belle experiment and would go on to win the 2008 Nobel Prize in Physics. The experiments stopped operation in June 2010. Choi is part of the Belle II experiment, which collected their first collisions in 2018. She served on the advisory board of the International Conference on High Energy Physics in Seoul in July 2018.

== Awards and honors ==
In 2004, Choi was awarded the Scientist of the Month award by the Ministry of Science and ICT and National Research Foundation of Korea. In 2017, Choi won the Ho-Am Prize in Science. The following year, Choi became a laureate of the Asian Scientist 100 by the Asian Scientist.
