= Y(4140) =

Subatomic particle

The Y(4140) particle is an electrically neutral exotic hadron candidate that is about 4.4 times heavier than the proton. It was observed at Fermilab and announced on 17 March 2009. This particle is extremely rare and was detected in only 20 of billions of collisions.

Since it decays into J/ψ and φ mesons, it has been suggested that this particle is composed of charm quarks and charm antiquarks, possibly even a four quark combination. The existence of the particle has been confirmed by members of the CMS collaboration at the Large Hadron Collider on November 14, 2012 and by the DØ experiment at the Tevatron on September 25, 2013. The Belle experiment has searched for this particle but found no evidence for its existence. The LHCb experiment observes a peak at the same position in the J/ψΦ invariant mass, but it is best described as a D_{s}^{±}D_{s}^{∗∓} cusp, and is much broader than the previous measurements of the Y(4140).

The Particle Data Group has renamed Y(4140) to follow naming conventions to X(4140).

== See also ==
- X(3872)
- Zc(3900)
- Z(4430)
