= Zc(3900) =

Subatomic particle made of quarks

Z_{c}(3900)
- Composition: Exotic meson
- Status: On hold

The Z_{c}(3900) is a hadron, a type of subatomic particle made of quarks, believed to be the first tetraquark that has been observed experimentally. The discovery was made in 2013 by two independent research groups: one using the BES III detector at the Chinese Beijing Electron Positron Collider, the other being part of the Belle experiment group at the Japanese KEK particle physics laboratory.

The Z_{c}(3900) is a decay product of the previously observed anomalous Y(4260) particle.

The Z_{c}(3900) in turn decays into a charged pion (π^{±}) and a J/ψ meson. This is consistent with the Z_{c}(3900) containing four or more quarks.

The first evidence of the neutral Z_{c}(3900) was provided by CLEO-c in 2013. It was later observed by BES III in 2015. It decays into a neutral pion (π^{0}) and a J/ψ meson.

Researchers were expected to run decay experiments in 2013 to determine the particle's nature with more precision.

== See also ==
- XYZ particle
- X(3872)
- Y(4140)
- Z(4430)
