= Exotic hadron =

Subatomic particles consisting of quarks and gluons

One model of a pentaquark: q is a quark and q̅ an antiquark; gluons (wavy lines) mediate strong interactions between quarks; red, green, and blue color charges must each be present, while the remaining quark and antiquark must share a color and its anticolor, in this example blue and antiblue (shown as yellow).

Exotic hadrons are subatomic particles composed of quarks other than those particles composed of a quark and an anti-quark or of three quarks. While "ordinary" or "well-known" hadrons such as protons and neutrons contain three quarks and mesons pair a quark with an antiquark, exotic hadrons like pentaquarks contain four quarks and an antiquark. Hadrons with explicit valence gluon content would also be considered exotic. In theory, there is no limit on the number of quarks in a hadron, as long as the hadron's color charge is white, or color-neutral.

Consistent with ordinary hadrons, exotic hadrons are classified as being either fermions, like ordinary baryons, or bosons, like ordinary mesons. According to this classification scheme, pentaquarks, containing five valence quarks, are exotic baryons, while tetraquarks (four valence quarks) and hexaquarks (six quarks, consisting of either a dibaryon or three quark-antiquark pairs) would be considered exotic mesons. Tetraquark and pentaquark particles are believed to have been observed and are being investigated; hexaquarks have not yet been confirmed as observed.

Exotic hadrons can be searched for by looking for S-matrix poles with quantum numbers forbidden to ordinary hadrons. Experimental signatures for such exotic hadrons had been seen by 2003 at the latest, but they remain a topic of controversy in particle physics.

Jaffe and Low suggested that the exotic hadrons manifest themselves as poles of the P matrix, and not of the S matrix. Experimental P-matrix poles are determined reliably in both the meson–meson channels and nucleon–nucleon channels.

== History ==
When the quark model was first postulated by Murray Gell-Mann and others in the 1960s, it was to organize the states known then to be in existence in a meaningful way. As quantum chromodynamics (QCD) developed over the next decade, it became apparent that there was no reason why only three-quark and quark-antiquark combinations could exist. Indeed, Gell-Mann's original 1964 paper alludes to the possibility of exotic hadrons and classifies hadrons into baryons and mesons depending upon whether they have an odd (baryon) or even (meson) number of valence quarks. In addition, it seemed that gluons, the mediator particles of the strong interaction, could also form bound states by themselves (glueballs) and with quarks (hybrid hadrons). Several decades have passed without conclusive evidence of an exotic hadron that could be associated with the S-matrix pole.

There have been many observations of so-called 'exotic candidates' experimentally observed, which are particles that don't appear to fit the standard quark model. The first few exotic candidates to be identified include the X(3872), which was discovered by the Belle experiment in Japan; the Y(4260) which was discovered at the BaBar experiment; and the Z_{c}^{+}(3900), which was discovered independently by the BES III experiment in China and the Belle experiment.

In April 2014, the LHCb collaboration confirmed the existence of the Z(4430)^{−}, discovered by the Belle experiment, and demonstrated that it must have a minimal quark content of cc̅du̅. Since this was the first exotic hadron to have its quark content experimentally identified, it is also the first unambiguous discovery of an exotic hadron.

In July 2015, LHCb announced the discovery of two particles, named P^{+}_{c}(4380) and P^{+}_{c}(4450), which must have minimal quark content cc̅uud, making them pentaquarks.

== Candidates ==
List of exotic hadron candidates
State	Experiments	Notes
X(3872)	Belle, BaBar, LHCb, CDF, DØ, CMS, ATLAS, BES III	
X(3915)	Belle, BaBar	
X(3940)	Belle	
X(4140)	CDF, CMS, DØ, LHCb	
X(4160)	Belle	
Y(4260)	BaBar, CLEO, Belle	
Y(4220)	BES III, Belle	
X(4274)	CDF, CMS, LHCb	
X(4350)	Belle	
Y(4360)	BaBar, Belle, BES III	
Y(4390)	BES III	
X(4500)	LHCb	
X(4700)	LHCb	
Y(4660)	Belle, BaBar	
X(6900)	LHCb	
Z_{c}^{+,0}(3900)	BES III, Belle	
Z_{c}^{+,0}(4020)	BES III	
Z^{+}(4050)	Belle, BaBar	
Z^{+}(4200)	Belle, LHCb	
Z^{+}(4250)	Belle, BaBar	
Z^{+}(4430)	Belle, LHCb	
P_{c}^{+}(4380)	LHCb	
P_{c}^{+}(4450)	LHCb	
Y_{b}(10860)	Belle	
Z_{b}^{+,0}(10610)	Belle	
Z_{b}^{+}(10650)	Belle	

== See also ==
- Exotic matter
- Exotic meson
- Exotic baryon
- Tetraquark
- Pentaquark
- Hexaquark
