= Glueball =

Hypothetical particle composed of gluons

In particle physics, a glueball (also gluonium, gluon-ball) is a hypothetical composite particle. It consists solely of gluons, without valence quarks. Such a state is possible because gluons carry color charge and experience the strong interaction between themselves. Glueballs are extremely difficult to identify in particle accelerators, because they mix with ordinary meson states. In pure gauge theory, glueballs are the only states of the spectrum and some of them are stable.

Theoretical calculations show that glueballs should exist at energy ranges accessible with current collider technology. However, due to the aforementioned difficulty (among others), they have so far not been observed and identified with certainty, although phenomenological calculations have suggested that an experimentally identified glueball candidate, denoted f_{0}(1710), has properties consistent with those expected of a Standard Model glueball.

The prediction that glueballs exist is an essential prediction of QCD as part of the Standard Model of particle physics that has not yet been unambiguously confirmed experimentally.

Experimental evidence was announced in 2021, by the TOTEM collaboration at the LHC in collaboration with the DØ collaboration at the former Tevatron collider at Fermilab, of odderon (a composite gluonic particle with odd C-parity) exchange. This exchange, associated with a quarkless three-gluon vector glueball, was identified in the comparison of proton–proton and proton–antiproton scattering. In 2024, the X(2370) particle was determined to have mass and spin parity consistent with that of a glueball. However, other exotic particle candidates such as a tetraquark could not be ruled out.

== Properties ==
In principle, it is theoretically possible for all properties of glueballs to be calculated exactly and derived directly from the equations and fundamental physical constants of quantum chromodynamics (QCD) without further experimental input. So, the predicted properties of these hypothetical particles can be described in exquisite detail using only Standard Model physics that has wide acceptance in the theoretical physics literature. But, there is considerable uncertainty in the measurement of some of the relevant key physical constants, and the QCD calculations are so difficult that solutions to these equations are almost always numerical approximations (calculated using several very different methods). This can lead to variation in theoretical predictions of glueball properties, like mass and branching ratios in glueball decays.

=== Constituent particles and color charge ===
Theoretical studies of glueballs have focused on glueballs consisting of either two gluons or three gluons, by analogy to mesons and baryons that have two and three quarks respectively. As in the case of mesons and baryons, glueballs would be QCD color charge neutral. The baryon number of a glueball is zero.

=== Total angular momentum ===
Double-gluon glueballs can have total angular momentum J = 0 (which are either scalar or pseudo-scalar) or J = 2. Triple-gluon glueballs can have total angular momentum J = 1 (vector boson) or J = 3. All glueballs have integer total angular momentum that implies that they are bosons rather than fermions.

Glueballs are the only particles predicted by the Standard Model with total angular momentum (J) (sometimes called intrinsic spin) that could be either 2 or 3 in their ground states, although mesons made of two quarks with J = 0 and J = 1 with similar masses have been observed and excited states of other mesons can have these values of total angular momentum.

=== Electric charge ===
All glueballs would have an electric charge of zero, as gluons themselves do not have an electric charge.

=== Mass and parity ===
Glueballs are predicted by quantum chromodynamics to be massive, despite the fact that gluons themselves have zero rest mass in the Standard Model. Glueballs with all four possible combinations of quantum numbers P (spatial parity) and C (charge parity) for every possible total angular momentum have been considered, producing at least fifteen possible glueball states including excited glueball states that share the same quantum numbers but have differing masses with the lightest states having masses as low as 1.4 GeV/c^{2} (for a glueball with quantum numbers J = 0, P = +1, C = +1, or equivalently J^{PC} = 0^{++}), and the heaviest states having masses as great as almost 5 GeV/c^{2} (for a glueball with quantum numbers J = 0, P = +1, C = −1, or J^{PC} = 0^{+−}).

These masses are on the same order of magnitude as the masses of many experimentally observed mesons and baryons, as well as to the masses of the tau lepton, charm quark, bottom quark, some hydrogen isotopes, and some helium isotopes.

=== Stability and decay channels ===
Just as all Standard Model mesons and baryons, except the proton, are unstable in isolation, all glueballs are predicted by the Standard Model to be unstable in isolation, with various QCD calculations predicting the total decay width (which is functionally related to half-life) for various glueball states. QCD calculations also make predictions regarding the expected decay patterns of glueballs. For example, glueballs would not have radiative or two photon decays, but would have decays into pairs of pions, pairs of kaons, or pairs of eta mesons.

== Practical impact on macroscopic low energy physics ==
Feynman diagram of a glueball (G) decaying to two pions (π). Such decays help the study of and search for glueballs.

Standard Model glueballs are extremely ephemeral (decaying almost immediately into more stable decay products) and are only generated in high energy physics. Thus in the natural conditions found on Earth that humans can easily observe, glueballs arise only synthetically. They are scientifically notable mostly because they are a testable prediction of the Standard Model, and not because of phenomenological impact on macroscopic processes, or their engineering applications.

== Lattice QCD simulations ==
Lattice QCD provides a way to study the glueball spectrum theoretically and from first principles. Some of the first quantities calculated using lattice QCD methods (in 1980) were glueball mass estimates. Morningstar and Peardon computed the masses of the lightest glueballs in QCD without dynamical quarks in 1999. The three lowest states are tabulated below. The presence of dynamical quarks would slightly alter these data, but also makes the computations more difficult. Since that time calculations within QCD (lattice and sum rules) find the lightest glueball to be a scalar with mass in the range of about 1000–1700 MeV/c^{2}. Lattice predictions for scalar and pseudoscalar glueballs, including their excitations, were confirmed by Dyson–Schwinger/Bethe–Salpeter equations in Yang–Mills theory.

J^{PC}	mass
0^{++}	1730±80 MeV/c^{2}
2^{++}	2400±120 MeV/c^{2}
0^{−+}	2590±130 MeV/c^{2}

== Experimental candidates ==
Particle accelerator experiments are often able to identify unstable composite particles and assign masses to those particles to a precision of approximately 10 MeV/c^{2}, without being able to immediately assign to the particle resonance that is observed all of the properties of that particle. Scores of such particles have been detected, although particles detected in some experiments but not others can be viewed as doubtful.

Many of these candidates have been the subject of active investigation for at least eighteen years. The GlueX experiment has been specifically designed to produce more definitive experimental evidence of glueballs.

Some of the candidate particle resonances that could be glueballs, although the evidence is not definitive, include the following.

=== Glueball candidates ===
- X(3020) observed by the BaBar collaboration is a candidate for an excited state of the J^{PC} = 2^{−+}, 1^{+−}, or 1^{−−} glueball states with a mass of about 3.02 GeV/c^{2}.
- X(2370) first observed by BES III in 2011.

=== Scalar glueball candidates ===
Various candidates for scalar glueballs were identified by Ochs:

- f_{0}(500) also known as σ – the properties of this particle are possibly consistent with a glueball of mass 1000 MeV/c^{2} or 1500 MeV/c^{2}.
- f_{0}(980) – the structure of this composite particle is consistent with the existence of a light glueball.
- f_{0}(1370) – existence of this resonance is disputed but is a candidate for a glueball–meson mixing state.
- f_{0}(1500), f_{0}(1710) – existence of these resonances is undisputed but their statuses as glueball–meson mixing states or pure glueballs is not well established.

=== Other candidates ===
- Gluon jets at the LEP experiment show a 40% excess over theoretical expectations of electromagnetically neutral clusters, which suggests that electromagnetically neutral particles expected in gluon-rich environments such as glueballs are likely to be present.

== See also ==
- Exotic meson
- GlueX
- Gluon
- Yang–Mills theory
