= Double-charm tetraquark =

Type of tetraquark

- Classification: meson
- Composition: 2 charm quarks 1 up antiquark 1 down antiquark
- Statistics: bosonic
- Family: hadron
- Mass: 3868±124 MeV/c^{2}
- Mean lifetime: 1.35+0.31 −0.21×10^{−21} s
- Electric charge: +1
- Spin: 1^{+}
- Isospin: 0

The double-charm tetraquark (T^{+}_{cc}, ccu̅d̅) is a type of long-lived tetraquark that was discovered in 2021 in the LHCb experiment conducted at the Large Hadron Collider. It contains four quarks: two charm quarks, an anti-up and an anti-down quark.

It has a theoretical computed mass of 3868±124 MeV/c^{2}. The discovery showed an exceptionally strong peak, with 20-sigma significance.

It is hypothesized that studying the behavior of the double-charm tetraquark may play a part in explaining the behavior of the strong force. Following the discovery of the T^{+}_{cc}, researchers now plan experiments to find its double-beauty counterpart T_{bb}. This tetraquark has been found to have a longer lifespan than most known exotic-matter particles.
