= Y(4260) =

Subatomic particle

- Status: Anomalous particle
- Discovered: BaBar experiment at Stanford University (Department of Energy in California)

The Y(4260) is an anomalous particle with an energy of 4260 MeV which does not appear to fit into the quark model. It was discovered by the BaBar experiment at Stanford University for the Department of Energy in California and later confirmed by several other experimental collaborations. It being a Charmonium state is unlikely because the Y(4260) is heavier than the threshold for production of two D mesons, yet sits, surprisingly in a dip in the production rate for pairs of D's. It is a possibility that it is a hybrid—a predicted but not-yet-seen type of particle, where a gluon is actually a permanent part of the makeup of the particle, instead of just an ephemeral messenger keeping the quarks bound together.

== See also ==
- Meson
- XYZ particle
- X(3872)
- Z(4430)
- Zc(3900)
