= Pentaquark =

Subatomic Particle with Five Quarks

Two models of a generic pentaquark

A five-quark "bag"

A "meson-baryon molecule"

A q indicates a quark and a q̅ an antiquark. Gluons (wavy lines) mediate strong interactions between quarks. Red, green, and blue colour charges must each be present, while the remaining quark and antiquark must share a colour and its anticolour, in this example blue and antiblue (shown as yellow).

A pentaquark is a subatomic particle, consisting of four quarks and one antiquark bound together. Evidence for the existence of pentaquarks has been found in decays of the bottom lambda baryon.

As quarks have a baryon number of + 1/3, and antiquarks of − 1/3, the pentaquark would have a total baryon number of 1, and thus would be a baryon. Further, because it has five quarks instead of the usual three found in regular baryons (a.k.a. "triquarks"), it is classified as an exotic baryon. The name pentaquark was coined by Claude Gignoux et al. (1987) and Harry J. Lipkin in 1987; however, the possibility of five-quark particles was identified as early as 1964 when Murray Gell-Mann first postulated the existence of quarks. Although predicted for decades, pentaquarks proved surprisingly difficult to discover and some physicists were beginning to suspect that an unknown law of nature prevented their production.

The first claim of pentaquark discovery was recorded at LEPS in Japan in 2003, and several experiments in the mid-2000s also reported discoveries of other pentaquark states. However, other researchers were not able to replicate the LEPS results, and the other pentaquark discoveries were not accepted because of poor data and statistical analysis. On 13 July 2015, the LHCb collaboration at CERN reported results consistent with pentaquark states in the decay of bottom Lambda baryons (Λ^{0}_{b}). On 26 March 2019, the LHCb collaboration announced the discovery of a new pentaquark that had not been previously observed. On 5 July 2022, the LHCb collaboration announced the discovery of the P^{Λ}_{ψs}(4338)^{0} (Note: The bracketed number is the calculated mass of the particle, measured in MeV.) pentaquark.

Outside of particle research laboratories, pentaquarks might be produced naturally in the processes that result in the formation of neutron stars.

== Background ==
A quark is a type of elementary particle that has mass, electric charge, and colour charge, as well as an additional property called flavour, which describes what type of quark it is (up, down, strange, charm, top, or bottom). Due to an effect known as colour confinement, quarks are never seen on their own. Instead, they form composite particles known as hadrons so that their colour charges cancel out. Hadrons made of one quark and one antiquark are known as mesons, while those made of three quarks are known as baryons. These 'regular' hadrons are well documented and characterized; however, there is nothing in theory to prevent quarks from forming 'exotic' hadrons such as tetraquarks with two quarks and two antiquarks, or pentaquarks with four quarks and one antiquark.

== Structure ==
A diagram of the P^{+}_{c} type pentaquark possibly discovered in July 2015, showing the flavours of each quark and one possible colour configuration.

A wide variety of pentaquarks are possible, with different quark combinations producing different particles. To identify which quarks compose a given pentaquark, physicists use the notation qqqqq̅, where q and q̅ respectively refer to any of the six flavours of quarks and antiquarks. The symbols u, d, s, c, b, and t stand for the up, down, strange, charm, bottom, and top quarks respectively, with the symbols of u̅, d̅, s̅, c̅, b̅, t̅ corresponding to the respective antiquarks. For instance a pentaquark made of two up quarks, one down quark, one charm quark, and one charm antiquark would be denoted uudcc̅.

The quarks are bound together by the strong force, which acts in such a way as to cancel the colour charges within the particle. In a meson, this means a quark is partnered with an antiquark with an opposite colour charge – blue and antiblue, for example – while in a baryon, the three quarks have between them all three colour charges – red, blue, and green. (Note: The colour charges do not correspond to physical visible colours. They are arbitrary labels used to help scientists describe and visualise the charges of quarks.) In a pentaquark, the colours also need to cancel out, and the only feasible combination is to have one quark with one colour (e.g. red), one quark with a second colour (e.g. green), two quarks with the third colour (e.g. blue), and one antiquark to counteract the surplus colour (e.g. antiblue).

The binding mechanism for pentaquarks is not yet clear. They may consist of five quarks tightly bound together, but it is also possible that they are more loosely bound and consist of a three-quark baryon and a two-quark meson interacting relatively weakly with each other via pion exchange (the same force that binds atomic nuclei) in a "meson-baryon molecule".

== History ==
=== Mid-2000s ===
The requirement to include an antiquark means that many classes of pentaquark are hard to identify experimentally – if the flavour of the antiquark matches the flavour of any other quark in the quintuplet, it will cancel out and the particle will resemble its three-quark hadron cousin. For this reason, early pentaquark searches looked for particles where the antiquark did not cancel. In the mid-2000s, several experiments claimed to reveal pentaquark states. In particular, a resonance with a mass of 1540 MeV/c^{2} (4.6 σ) was reported by LEPS in 2003, the Θ^{+}. This coincided with a pentaquark state with a mass of 1530 MeV/c^{2} predicted in 1997.

The proposed state was composed of two up quarks, two down quarks, and one strange antiquark (uudds̅). Following this announcement, nine other independent experiments reported seeing narrow peaks from nK^{+} and pK^{0}, with masses between 1522 MeV/c^{2} and 1555 MeV/c^{2}, all above 4 σ. While concerns existed about the validity of these states, the Particle Data Group gave the Θ^{+} a 3-star rating (out of 4) in the 2004 Review of Particle Physics. Two other pentaquark states were reported albeit with low statistical significance—the Φ^{−−} (ddssu̅), with a mass of 1860 MeV/c^{2} and the Θ^{0}_{c} (uuddc̅), with a mass of 3099 MeV/c^{2}. Both were later found to be statistical effects rather than true resonances.

Ten experiments then looked for the Θ^{+}, but came out empty-handed. Two in particular (one at BELLE, and the other at CLAS) had nearly the same conditions as other experiments which claimed to have detected the Θ^{+} (DIANA and SAPHIR respectively). The 2006 Review of Particle Physics concluded:

[T]here has not been a high-statistics confirmation of any of the original experiments that claimed to see the Θ^{+}; there have been two high-statistics repeats from Jefferson Lab that have clearly shown the original positive claims in those two cases to be wrong; there have been a number of other high-statistics experiments, none of which have found any evidence for the Θ^{+}; and all attempts to confirm the two other claimed pentaquark states have led to negative results. The conclusion that pentaquarks in general, and the Θ^{+}, in particular, do not exist, appears compelling.

The 2008 Review of Particle Physics went even further:

There are two or three recent experiments that find weak evidence for signals near the nominal masses, but there is simply no point in tabulating them in view of the overwhelming evidence that the claimed pentaquarks do not exist... The whole story—the discoveries themselves, the tidal wave of papers by theorists and phenomenologists that followed, and the eventual "undiscovery"—is a curious episode in the history of science.

Despite these null results, LEPS results continued to show the existence of a narrow state with a mass of 1524±4 MeV/c^{2}, with a statistical significance of 5.1 σ.

However this 'discovery' was later revealed to be due to flawed methodology (https://www.osti.gov/biblio/21513283-critical-view-claimed-theta-sup-pentaquark).

=== 2015 LHCb results ===
Feynman diagram representing the decay of a lambda baryon Λ^{0}_{b} into a kaon K^{−} and a pentaquark P^{+}_{c}.

In July 2015, the LHCb collaboration at CERN identified pentaquarks in the Λ^{0}_{b}→J/ψK^{−}p channel, which represents the decay of the bottom lambda baryon (Λ^{0}_{b}) into a J/ψ meson (J/ψ), a kaon (K^{−}) and a proton (p). The results showed that sometimes, instead of decaying via intermediate lambda states, the Λ^{0}_{b} decayed via intermediate pentaquark states. The two states, named P^{+}_{c}(4380) and P^{+}_{c}(4450), had individual statistical significances of 9 σ and 12 σ, respectively, and a combined significance of 15 σ – enough to claim a formal discovery. The analysis ruled out the possibility that the effect was caused by conventional particles. The two pentaquark states were both observed decaying strongly to J/ψp, hence must have a valence quark content of two up quarks, a down quark, a charm quark, and an anti-charm quark (uudcc̅), making them charmonium-pentaquarks.

The search for pentaquarks was not an objective of the LHCb experiment (which is primarily designed to investigate matter-antimatter asymmetry) and the apparent discovery of pentaquarks was described as an "accident" and "something we've stumbled across" by the Physics Coordinator for the experiment.

=== Studies of pentaquarks in other experiments ===
A fit to the J/ψp invariant mass spectrum for the Λ^{0}_{b}→J/ψK^{−}p decay, with each fit component shown individually. The contribution of the pentaquarks are shown by hatched histograms.

The production of pentaquarks from electroweak decays of Λ^{0}_{b} baryons has extremely small cross-section and yields very limited information about internal structure of pentaquarks. For this reason, there are several ongoing and proposed initiatives to study pentaquark production in other channels.

It is expected that pentaquarks will be studied in electron-proton collisions in Hall B E12-12-001A and Hall C E2-16-007 experiments at JLab. The major challenge in these studies is a heavy mass of the pentaquark, which will be produced at the tail of photon-proton spectrum in JLab kinematics. For this reason, the currently unknown branching fractions of pentaquark should be sufficiently large to allow pentaquark detection in JLab kinematics. The proposed Electron Ion Collider which has higher energies is much better suited for this problem.

An interesting channel to study pentaquarks in proton-nuclear collisions was suggested by Schmidt & Siddikov (2016). This process has a large cross-section due to lack of electroweak intermediaries and gives access to pentaquark wave function. In the fixed-target experiments pentaquarks will be produced with small rapidities in laboratory frame and will be easily detected. Besides, if there are neutral pentaquarks, as suggested in several models based on flavour symmetry, these might be also produced in this mechanism. This process might be studied at future high-luminosity experiments like After@LHC and NICA.

=== 2019 LHCb results ===
On 26 March 2019, the LHCb collaboration announced the discovery of a new pentaquark, based on observations that passed the 5-sigma threshold, using a dataset that was many times larger than the 2015 dataset.

Designated P_{c}(4312)^{+} (P_{c}^{+} identifies a charmonium-pentaquark while the number between parenthesis indicates a mass of about 4312 MeV), the pentaquark decays to a proton and a J/ψ meson. The analyses revealed additionally that the earlier reported observations of the P_{c}(4450)^{+} pentaquark actually were the average of two different resonances, designated P_{c}(4440)^{+} and P_{c}(4457)^{+}. Understanding this will require further study.

=== 2022 LHCb results ===
On 5 July 2022, the LHCb collaboration announced the discovery of a further new pentaquark, with a significance of 15-sigma. Designated P_{ψs}^{Λ}(4338)^{0}, its composition is described as udscc̅, representing the first confirmed pentaquark containing a strange quark.

== Applications ==
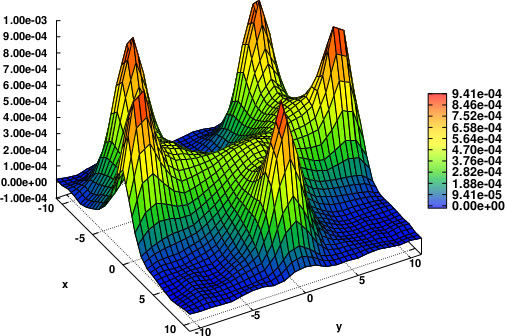
Colour flux tubes produced by five static quark and antiquark charges, computed in lattice QCD. Confinement in quantum chromodynamics leads to the production of flux tubes connecting colour charges. The flux tubes act as attractive QCD string-like potentials.

The discovery of pentaquarks will allow physicists to study the strong force in greater detail and aid understanding of quantum chromodynamics. In addition, current theories suggest that some very large stars produce pentaquarks as they collapse. The study of pentaquarks might help shed light on the physics of neutron stars.

== See also ==
- Baryon (triquark)
- Exotic matter
- Heptaquark
- Hexaquark
- List of particles
- Quark model
- Tetraquark
