= Z(4430) =

Mesonic resonance discovered by the Belle experiment

- Classification: Exotic meson
- Composition: cc̅du̅

Z(4430) is a mesonic resonance discovered by the Belle experiment. It has a mass of 4430 MeV/c^{2}. The resonant nature of the peak has been confirmed by the LHCb experiment with a significance of at least 13.9 σ. The particle is charged and is thought to have a quark content of cc̅du̅, making it a tetraquark candidate. It has the spin-parity quantum numbers J^{P} = 1^{+}.

The particle joins the X(3872), Z_{c}(3900) and Y(4140) as exotic hadron candidates observed by multiple experiments, although it is the first to be confirmed as a resonance.

== See also ==
- XYZ particle
