= Subatomic particle =

Particle smaller than an atom

A composite particle proton is made of two up quarks and one down quark, which are elementary particles.

In physics, a subatomic particle is a particle smaller than an atom. According to the Standard Model of particle physics, a subatomic particle can be a composite particle or an elementary particle. A composite particle, such as a proton or a neutron, is composed of other particles, while an elementary particle, such as an electron, is not composed of any substructure. Particle physics and nuclear physics study these particles and how they interact. Most force-carrying particles are called bosons. Some bosons, such as photons and gluons, have zero rest mass, whereas others, such as the W and Z bosons and the Higgs boson, possess relatively large rest masses (approximately 80 GeV/c^{2}, 90 GeV/c^{2}, and 125 GeV/c^{2} respectively). This contrasts with fermions, which are matter particles that possess rest mass and obey the Pauli exclusion principle.

Experiments show that light can behave like a stream of particles (called photons) as well as exhibiting wave-like properties. This led to the concept of wave–particle duality to reflect that quantum systems exhibit both particle-like and wave-like behaviors.

Another concept, the uncertainty principle, states that certain pairs of physical properties, such as simultaneous position and momentum, cannot be measured simultaneously with arbitrary precision. Interactions of particles in the framework of quantum field theory are understood as the creation and annihilation of quanta associated with fundamental interactions.

Even among particle physicists, the exact philosophical definition of a particle varies. Common perspectives include:

- A particle as a collapsed wave function
- A particle as an excitation of a quantum field
- A particle as an irreducible representation of the Poincaré group
- A particle as a localized detection event in an apparatus

Particles in the atom
Subatomic particle	Symbol	Type	Location in atom	Charge [e]	Mass [Da]
proton	p^{+}	composite	nucleus	+1	≈ 1
neutron	n^{0}	composite	nucleus	0	≈ 1
electron	e^{−}	elementary	shells	−1	≈ 0.00055

== Classification ==
=== By composition ===
Subatomic particles are either "elementary", i.e. not made of multiple other particles, or "composite" and made of more than one elementary particle bound together.

The elementary particles of the Standard Model are:

- Six flavors of quarks: up, down, charm, strange, top, and bottom;
- Six types of leptons: electron, electron neutrino, muon, muon neutrino, tau, tau neutrino;
- Twelve gauge bosons (force carriers): the photon of electromagnetism, the three W and Z bosons of the weak force, and the eight gluons of the strong force;
- The Higgs boson.

The Standard Model classification of elementary particles

All of these have now been discovered through experiments, with the latest being the top quark (1995), tau neutrino (2000), and Higgs boson (2012).

Various extensions of the Standard Model predict the existence of an elementary graviton particle and many other elementary particles, but none have been discovered.

==== Hadrons ====
The word hadron comes from Greek and was introduced in 1962 by Lev Okun. Nearly all composite particles contain multiple quarks (and/or antiquarks) bound together by gluons (with a few exceptions with no quarks, such as positronium and muonium). Those containing few (≤ 5) quarks (including antiquarks) are called hadrons. Due to a property known as color confinement, quarks are never found singly but always occur in hadrons containing multiple quarks. The hadrons are divided by number of quarks (including antiquarks) into the baryons containing an odd number of quarks (almost always 3), of which the proton and neutron (the two nucleons) are by far the best known; and the mesons containing an even number of quarks (almost always 2, one quark and one antiquark), of which the pions and kaons are the best known.

Except for the proton and neutron, all other hadrons are unstable and decay into other particles in microseconds or less. A proton is made of two up quarks and one down quark, while the neutron is made of two down quarks and one up quark. These commonly bind together into an atomic nucleus, e.g. a helium-4 nucleus is composed of two protons and two neutrons. Most hadrons do not live long enough to bind into nucleus-like composites; those that do (other than the proton and neutron) form exotic nuclei.

=== By statistics ===
Overlap between bosons, hadrons, and fermions

Any subatomic particle, like any particle in the three-dimensional space that obeys the laws of quantum mechanics, can be either a boson (with integer spin) or a fermion (with odd half-integer spin).

In the Standard Model, all the elementary fermions have spin 1/2, and are divided into the quarks which carry color charge and therefore feel the strong interaction, and the leptons which do not. The elementary bosons comprise the gauge bosons (photon, W and Z, gluons) with spin 1, while the Higgs boson is the only elementary particle with spin zero.

The hypothetical graviton is required theoretically to have spin 2, but is not part of the Standard Model. Some extensions such as supersymmetry predict additional elementary particles with spin 3/2, but none have been discovered as of 2026.

Due to the laws for spin of composite particles, the baryons (3 quarks) have spin either 1/2 or 3/2 and are therefore fermions; the mesons (2 quarks) have integer spin of either 0 or 1 and are therefore bosons.

=== By mass ===
In special relativity, the energy of a particle at rest equals its mass times the speed of light squared, E = mc^{2}. That is, mass can be expressed in terms of energy and vice versa. If a particle has a frame of reference in which it lies at rest, then it has a positive rest mass and is referred to as massive.

All composite particles are massive. Baryons (meaning "heavy") tend to have greater mass than mesons (meaning "intermediate"), which in turn tend to be heavier than leptons (meaning "lightweight"), but the heaviest lepton (the tau particle) is heavier than the two lightest flavours of baryons (nucleons). It is also certain that any particle with an electric charge is massive.

When originally defined in the 1950s, the terms baryons, mesons and leptons referred to masses; however, after the quark model became accepted in the 1970s, it was recognised that baryons are composites of three quarks, mesons are composites of one quark and one antiquark, while leptons are elementary and are defined as the elementary fermions with no color charge.

All massless particles (particles whose invariant mass is zero) are elementary. These include the photon and gluon, although the latter cannot be isolated.

=== By decay ===
Most subatomic particles are unstable. All leptons (except the electron) as well as baryons undergo particle decay via the strong or weak force. Protons are not known to decay, although whether they are strictly stable remains an open question in physics, as some Grand Unified Theories (GUTs) predict proton decay. Muons and tau leptons decay via the weak force. Neutrinos do not decay, but undergo neutrino oscillations. The electron is theoretically stable because it is the lightest charged particle; conservation of charge prevents it from decaying into lighter particles, as no lighter charged particles exist.

== Other properties ==
All observable subatomic particles have their electric charge an integer multiple of the elementary charge. The Standard Model's quarks have "non-integer" electric charges, namely, multiple of 1/3 e, but quarks (and other combinations with non-integer electric charge) cannot be isolated due to color confinement. For baryons, mesons, and their antiparticles the constituent quarks' charges sum up to an integer multiple of e.

Through the work of Albert Einstein, Satyendra Nath Bose, Louis de Broglie, and many others, current scientific theory holds that all particles also have a wave nature. This has been verified not only for elementary particles but also for compound particles such as atoms and even molecules. In fact, according to traditional formulations of non-relativistic quantum mechanics, wave–particle duality applies to all objects, even macroscopic ones; although the wave properties of macroscopic objects cannot be detected due to their small wavelengths.

Interactions between particles have been scrutinized for many centuries, and a few simple laws underpin how particles behave in collisions and interactions. The most fundamental of these are the laws of conservation of energy and conservation of momentum, which let us make calculations of particle interactions on scales of magnitude that range from stars to quarks. These are the prerequisite basics of Newtonian mechanics, a series of statements and equations in Philosophiae Naturalis Principia Mathematica, originally published in 1687.

== Dividing an atom ==
The negatively charged electron has a mass of about 1/1836 of that of a hydrogen atom. The remainder of the hydrogen atom's mass comes from the positively charged proton. The atomic number of an element is the number of protons in its nucleus. Neutrons are neutral particles having a mass slightly greater than that of the proton. Different isotopes of the same element contain the same number of protons but different numbers of neutrons. The mass number of an isotope is the total number of nucleons (neutrons and protons collectively).

Chemistry concerns itself with how electron sharing binds atoms into structures such as crystals and molecules. The subatomic particles considered important in the understanding of chemistry are the electron, the proton, and the neutron. Nuclear physics deals with how protons and neutrons arrange themselves in nuclei. The study of subatomic particles, atoms and molecules, and their structure and interactions, requires quantum mechanics. Analyzing processes that change the numbers and types of particles requires quantum field theory. The study of subatomic particles per se is called particle physics. The term high-energy physics is nearly synonymous to "particle physics" since creation of particles requires high energies: it occurs only as a result of cosmic rays, or in particle accelerators. Particle phenomenology systematizes the knowledge about subatomic particles obtained from these experiments.

== History ==
The term "subatomic particle" is largely a retronym of the 1960s, used to distinguish a large number of baryons and mesons (which comprise hadrons) from particles that are now thought to be truly elementary. Before that hadrons were usually classified as "elementary" because their composition was unknown.

A list of important discoveries follows:

Particle	Composition	Theorized	Discovered	Comments
electron e^{−}	elementary (lepton)	G. Johnstone Stoney (1874)	J. J. Thomson (1897)	Minimum unit of electrical charge, for which Stoney suggested the name in 1891. First subatomic particle to be identified.
alpha particle α	composite (atomic nucleus)	None	Ernest Rutherford (1899)	Proven by Rutherford and Thomas Royds in 1907 to be helium nuclei. Rutherford won the Nobel Prize for Chemistry in 1908 for this discovery.
photon γ	elementary (quantum)	Max Planck (1900)	Albert Einstein (1905)	Necessary to solve the thermodynamic problem of black-body radiation.
proton p	composite (baryon)	William Prout (1815)	Ernest Rutherford (1919, named 1920)	The nucleus of ^{1}H.
neutron n	composite (baryon)	Ernest Rutherford (c.1920)	James Chadwick (1932)	The second nucleon.
antiparticles		Paul Dirac (1928)	Carl D. Anderson (e^{+}, 1932)	Revised explanation uses CPT symmetry.
pions π	composite (mesons)	Hideki Yukawa (1935)	César Lattes, Giuseppe Occhialini, Cecil Powell (1947)	Explains the nuclear force between nucleons. The first meson (by modern definition) to be discovered.
muon μ^{−}	elementary (lepton)	None	Carl D. Anderson (1936)	Called a "meson" at first; but today classed as a lepton.
tau τ^{−}	elementary (lepton)	Antonio Zichichi (1960)	Martin Lewis Perl (1975)	
kaons K	composite (mesons)	None	G. D. Rochester, C. C. Butler (1947)	Discovered in cosmic rays. The first strange particle.
lambda baryons Λ	composite (baryons)	None	University of Melbourne (Λ^{0}, 1950)	The first hyperon discovered.
neutrino ν	elementary (lepton)	Wolfgang Pauli (1930), named by Enrico Fermi	Clyde Cowan, Frederick Reines (ν_{e}, 1956)	Solved the problem of energy spectrum of beta decay.
quarks (u, d, s)	elementary	Murray Gell-Mann, George Zweig (1964)	Indirect confirmation via deep inelastic scattering (late 1960s)	
charm quark c	elementary (quark)	Sheldon Glashow, John Iliopoulos, Luciano Maiani (1970)	B. Richter, S. C. C. Ting (J/ψ, 1974)	
bottom quark b	elementary (quark)	Makoto Kobayashi, Toshihide Maskawa (1973)	Leon M. Lederman (ϒ, 1977)	
gluons	elementary (quantum)	Harald Fritzsch, Murray Gell-Mann (1972)	DESY (1979)	
weak gauge bosons W^{±}, Z^{0}	elementary (quantum)	Sheldon Glashow, Steven Weinberg, Abdus Salam (1968)	CERN (1983)	Properties verified through the 1990s.
top quark t	elementary (quark)	Makoto Kobayashi, Toshihide Maskawa (1973)	Fermilab (1995)	Does not hadronize, but is necessary to complete the Standard Model.
Higgs boson	elementary (quantum)	Peter Higgs (1964)	CERN (2012)	Only known spin zero elementary particle.
tetraquark	composite	None	Z_{c}(3900) (2013)	A class of exotic hadrons.
pentaquark	composite	None	LHCb (2015)	Another class of exotic hadrons.
graviton	elementary (quantum)	Albert Einstein (1916)	Hypothetical	Interpretation of a gravitational wave as individual quanta remains experimentally out of reach.
magnetic monopole	elementary (unclassified)	Paul Dirac (1931)	Hypothetical	

== See also ==
- Atom: Journey Across the Subatomic Cosmos (book)
- Atom: An Odyssey from the Big Bang to Life on Earth...and Beyond (book)
- CPT invariance
- Dark matter
- Hot spot effect in subatomic physics
- List of fictional elements, materials, isotopes and atomic particles
- List of particles
- Poincaré symmetry
- Subatomic scale
