= Tetraquark =

Exotic meson composed of four valence quarks

In particle physics, a tetraquark is an exotic meson composed of four valence quarks. A tetraquark state has long been suspected to be allowed by quantum chromodynamics, the modern theory of strong interactions. A tetraquark state is an example of an exotic hadron that lies outside the conventional quark model classification. A number of different types of tetraquark have been observed.

== History ==
Several tetraquark candidates have been reported by particle physics experiments in the 21st century. The quark contents of these states are almost all qq̅QQ̅, where q represents a light (up, down or strange) quark, Q represents a heavy (charm or bottom) quark, and antiquarks are denoted with an overline. The existence and stability of tetraquark states with the qqQ̅Q̅ (or q̅q̅QQ) have been discussed by theoretical physicists for a long time, however these are yet to be reported by experiments.

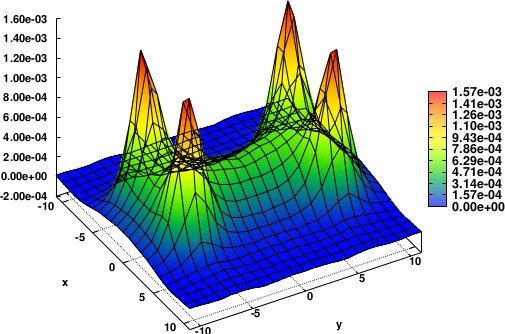
Colour flux tubes produced by four static quark and antiquark charges, computed in lattice QCD. Confinement in quantum chromodynamics leads to the production of flux tubes connecting colour charges. The flux tubes act as attractive QCD string-like potentials.

Timeline

In 2003, a particle temporarily called X(3872), by the Belle experiment in Japan, was proposed to be a tetraquark candidate, as originally theorized. The name X is a temporary name, indicating that there are still some questions about its properties to be tested. The number following is the mass of the particle in MeV/c^{2}.

In 2004, the D_{sJ}(2632) state seen in Fermilab's SELEX was suggested as a possible tetraquark candidate.

In 2007, Belle announced the observation of the Z(4430) state, a cc̅du̅ tetraquark candidate. There are also indications that the Y(4660), also discovered by Belle in 2007, could be a tetraquark state.

In 2009, Fermilab announced that they have discovered a particle temporarily called Y(4140), which may also be a tetraquark.

In 2010, two physicists from DESY and a physicist from Quaid-i-Azam University re-analyzed former experimental data and announced that, in connection with the ϒ(5S) meson (a form of bottomonium), a well-defined tetraquark resonance exists.

In June 2013, the BES III experiment in China and the Belle experiment in Japan independently reported on Z_{c}(3900), the first confirmed four-quark state.

In 2014, the Large Hadron Collider experiment LHCb confirmed the existence of the Z(4430) state with a significance of over 13.9 σ.

In February 2016, the DØ experiment reported evidence of a narrow tetraquark candidate, named X(5568), decaying to B^{0}_{s}π^{±}. In December 2017, DØ also reported observing the X(5568) using a different B^{0}_{s} final state. However, it was not observed in searches by the LHCb, CMS, CDF, or ATLAS experiments.

In June 2016, LHCb announced the discovery of three additional tetraquark candidates, called X(4274), X(4500) and X(4700).

In 2020, LHCb announced the discovery of a ccc̅c̅ tetraquark: X(6900). In 2022, ATLAS also observed X(6900), and in 2023, CMS reported an observation of three such states, X(6600), X(6900), and X(7300).

In 2021, LHCb announced the discovery of four additional tetraquarks, including cc̅us̅.

== List of known tetraquarks ==
List of known tetraquarks
Name	Year discovered	Ref.
cc̅du̅	2007	
ccc̅c̅	2020	
cc̅us̅	2021	
ccu̅d̅	2022	
cs̅ud̅	2022	
cs̅u̅d	2022	

== See also ==
- Color confinement
- Double-charm tetraquark
- Hadron
- Pentaquark
- Tetraneutron
