= Quark =

Elementary particle, fundamental constituent of matter

- A proton is composed of two up quarks, one down quark, and the gluons that mediate the forces "binding" them together. The color assignment of individual quarks is arbitrary, but all three colors must be present; red, blue and green are used as an analogy to the primary colors that together produce a white color.
- Composition: elementary particle
- Statistics: fermionic
- Generation: 1st, 2nd, 3rd
- Interactions: strong, weak, electromagnetic, gravitation
- Symbol: q
- Antiparticle: antiquark (q̅)
- Theorized: Murray Gell-Mann (1964); George Zweig (1964)
- Discovered: SLAC (c. 1968)
- Types: 6 (up, down, strange, charm, bottom, and top)
- Electric charge: +2/3 e, −1/3 e
- Color charge: yes
- Spin: 1/2 ħ
- Baryon number: 1/3

A quark (/ˈkwɔːrk, ˈkwɑːrk/) is a type of elementary particle and a fundamental constituent of matter. Quarks combine to form composite particles called hadrons, the most stable of which are protons and neutrons, the components of atomic nuclei. All commonly observable matter is composed of up quarks, down quarks, and electrons. Owing to a phenomenon known as color confinement, quarks are never found in isolation; they can be found only within hadrons, which include baryons (such as protons and neutrons) and mesons, or in quark–gluon plasmas. (Note: There is also the theoretical possibility of more exotic phases of quark matter.) For this reason, much of what is known about quarks has been drawn from observations of hadrons.

Quarks have various intrinsic properties, including electric charge, mass, color charge, and spin. They are the only elementary particles in the Standard Model of particle physics to experience all four fundamental interactions, also known as fundamental forces (electromagnetism, gravitation, strong interaction, and weak interaction), as well as the only known particles whose electric charges are not integer multiples of the elementary charge.

There are six types, known as flavors, of quarks: up, down, charm, strange, top, and bottom. Up and down quarks have the lowest masses of all quarks. The heavier quarks rapidly change into up and down quarks through a process of particle decay: the transformation from a higher mass state to a lower mass state. Because of this, up and down quarks are generally stable and the most common in the universe, whereas strange, charm, bottom, and top quarks can only be produced in high energy collisions (such as those involving cosmic rays and in particle accelerators). For every quark flavor there is a corresponding type of antiparticle, known as an antiquark, that differs from the quark only in that some of its properties (such as the electric charge) have equal magnitude but opposite sign.

The quark model was independently proposed by physicists Murray Gell-Mann and George Zweig in 1964. Quarks were introduced as parts of an ordering scheme for hadrons, and there was little evidence for their physical existence until deep inelastic scattering experiments at the Stanford Linear Accelerator Center in 1968. Accelerator program experiments have provided evidence for all six flavors. The top quark, first observed at Fermilab in 1995, was the last to be discovered.

== Classification ==
Six of the particles in the Standard Model are quarks (shown in purple). Each of the first three columns forms a generation of matter.

The Standard Model is the theoretical framework describing all the known elementary particles. This model contains six flavors of quarks (q), named up (u), down (d), strange (s), charm (c), bottom (b), and top (t). Antiparticles of quarks are called antiquarks, and are denoted by a bar over the symbol for the corresponding quark, such as u̅ for an up antiquark. As with antimatter in general, antiquarks have the same mass, mean lifetime, and spin as their respective quarks, but the electric charge and other charges have the opposite sign.

Quarks are spin-1/2 particles, which means they are fermions according to the spin–statistics theorem. They are subject to the Pauli exclusion principle, which states that no two identical fermions can simultaneously occupy the same quantum state. This is in contrast to bosons (particles with integer spin), of which any number can be in the same state. Unlike leptons, quarks possess color charge, which causes them to engage in the strong interaction. The resulting attraction between different quarks causes the formation of composite particles known as hadrons (see § Strong interaction and color charge below).

The quarks that determine the quantum numbers of hadrons are called valence quarks; apart from these, any hadron may contain an indefinite number of virtual "sea" quarks, antiquarks, and gluons, which do not influence its quantum numbers. There are two families of hadrons: baryons, with three valence quarks, and mesons, with a valence quark and an antiquark. The most common baryons are the proton and the neutron, the building blocks of the atomic nucleus. A great number of hadrons are known (see list of baryons and list of mesons), most of them differentiated by their quark content and the properties these constituent quarks confer. The existence of "exotic" hadrons with more valence quarks, such as tetraquarks (qqq̅q̅) and pentaquarks (qqqqq̅), was conjectured from the beginnings of the quark model but not discovered until the early 21st century.

Elementary fermions are grouped into three generations, each comprising two leptons and two quarks. The first generation includes up and down quarks, the second strange and charm quarks, and the third bottom and top quarks. All searches for a fourth generation of quarks and other elementary fermions have failed, and there is strong indirect evidence that no more than three generations exist. (Note: The main evidence is based on the resonance width of the Z^{0} boson, which constrains the 4th generation neutrino to have a mass greater than ~45 GeV/c^{2}. This would be highly contrasting with the other three generations' neutrinos, whose masses cannot exceed 2 MeV/c^{2}.) Particles in higher generations generally have greater mass and less stability, causing them to decay into lower-generation particles by means of weak interactions. Only first-generation (up and down) quarks occur commonly in nature. Heavier quarks can only be created in high-energy collisions (such as in those involving cosmic rays), and decay quickly; however, they are thought to have been present during the first fractions of a second after the Big Bang, when the universe was in an extremely hot and dense phase (the quark epoch). Studies of heavier quarks are conducted in artificially created conditions, such as in particle accelerators.

Having electric charge, mass, color charge, and flavor, quarks are the only known elementary particles that engage in all four fundamental interactions of contemporary physics: electromagnetism, gravitation, strong interaction, and weak interaction. Gravitation is too weak to be relevant to individual particle interactions except at extremes of energy (Planck energy) and distance scales (Planck distance). However, since no successful quantum theory of gravity exists, gravitation is not described by the Standard Model.

See the table of properties below for a more complete overview of the six quark flavors' properties.

== History ==
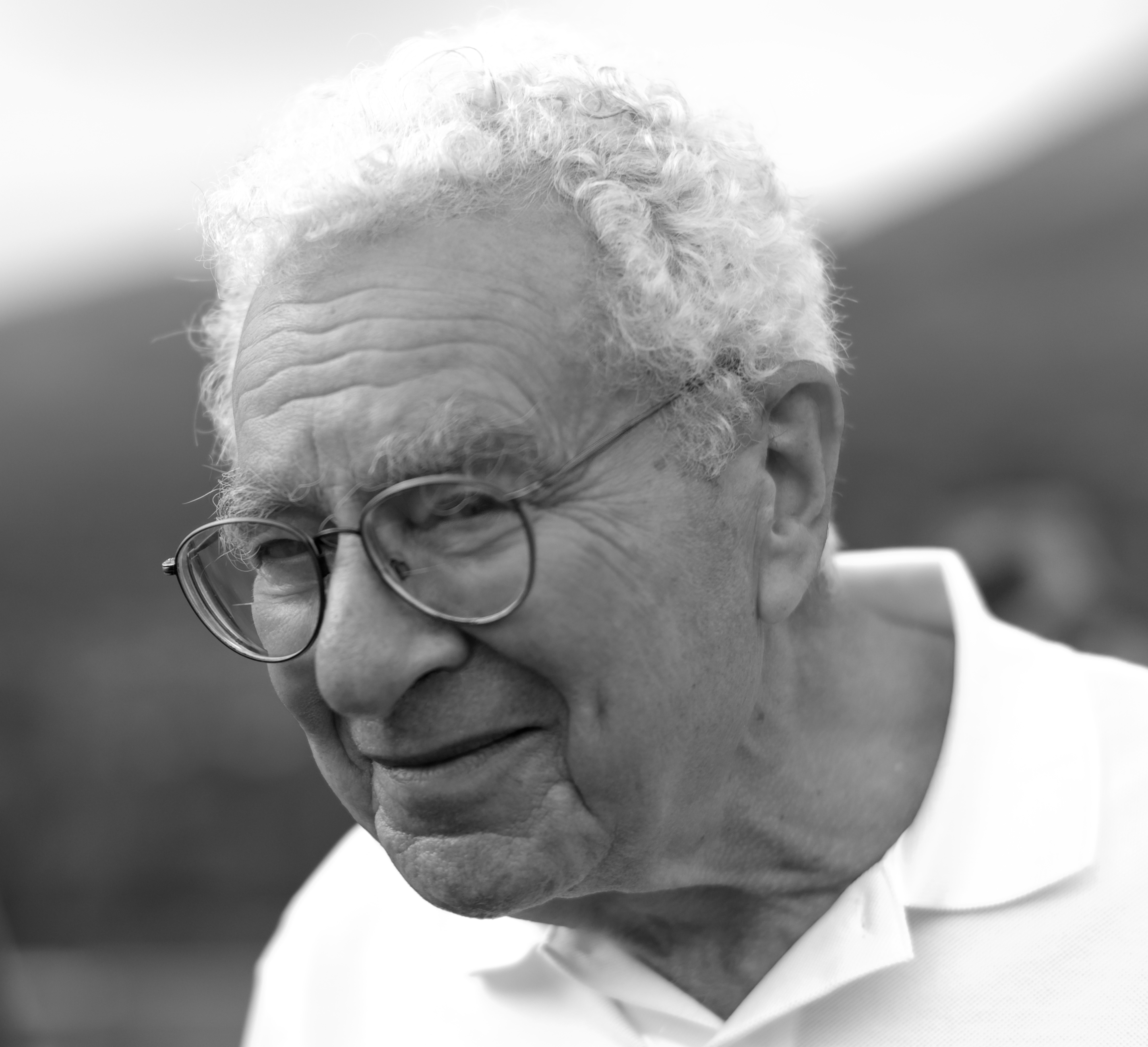
Murray Gell-Mann (2007)

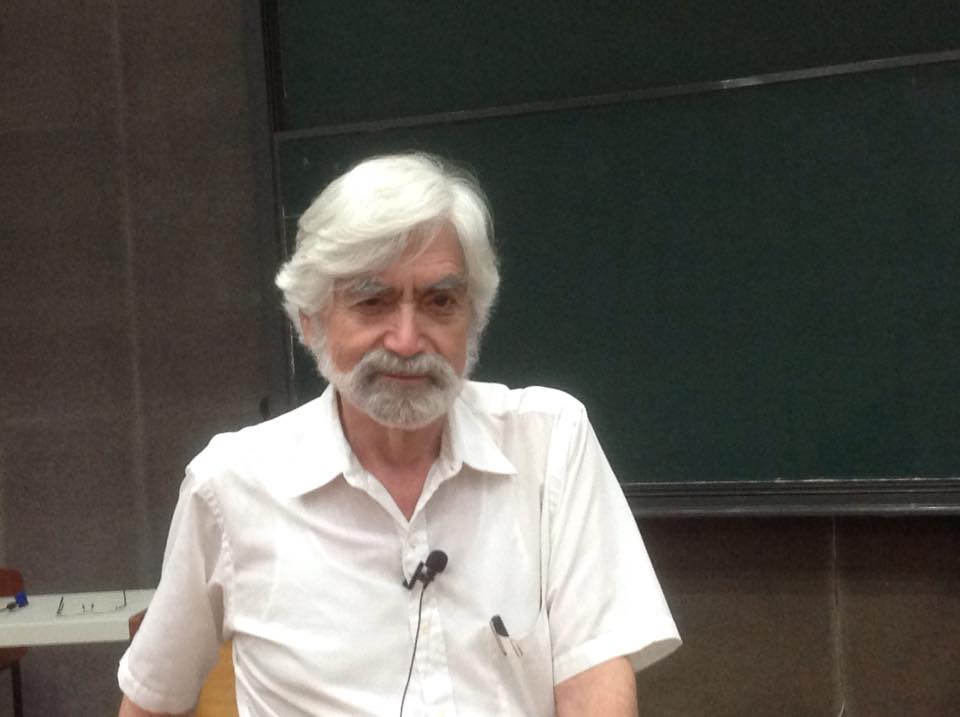
George Zweig (2015)

The quark model was independently proposed by physicists Murray Gell-Mann and George Zweig in 1964. The proposal came shortly after Gell-Mann's 1961 formulation of a particle classification system known as the Eightfold Way—or, in more technical terms, SU(3) flavor symmetry, streamlining its structure. Physicist Yuval Ne'eman had independently developed a scheme similar to the Eightfold Way in the same year. An early attempt at constituent organization was available in the Sakata model.

At the time of the quark theory's inception, the "particle zoo" included a multitude of hadrons, among other particles. Gell-Mann and Zweig posited that they were not elementary particles, but were instead composed of combinations of quarks and antiquarks. Their model involved three flavors of quarks, up, down, and strange, to which they ascribed properties such as spin and electric charge. The initial reaction of the physics community to the proposal was mixed. There was particular contention about whether the quark was a physical entity or a mere abstraction used to explain concepts that were not fully understood at the time.

In less than a year, extensions to the Gell-Mann–Zweig model were proposed. Sheldon Glashow and James Bjorken predicted the existence of a fourth flavor of quark, which they called charm. The addition was proposed because it allowed for a better description of the weak interaction (the mechanism that allows quarks to decay), equalized the number of known quarks with the number of known leptons, and implied a mass formula that correctly reproduced the masses of the known mesons.

Deep inelastic scattering experiments conducted in 1968 at the Stanford Linear Accelerator Center (SLAC) and published on October 20, 1969, showed that the proton contained much smaller, point-like objects and was therefore not an elementary particle. Physicists were reluctant to firmly identify these objects with quarks at the time, instead calling them "partons"—a term coined by Richard Feynman. The objects that were observed at SLAC would later be identified as up and down quarks as the other flavors were discovered. Nevertheless, "parton" remains in use as a collective term for the constituents of hadrons (quarks, antiquarks, and gluons). Richard Taylor, Henry Kendall and Jerome Friedman received the 1990 Nobel Prize in physics for their work at SLAC.

Photograph of the event that led to the discovery of the Σ^{++}_{c} baryon, at the Brookhaven National Laboratory in 1974

The strange quark's existence was indirectly validated by SLAC's scattering experiments: not only was it a necessary component of Gell-Mann and Zweig's three-quark model, but it provided an explanation for the kaon (K) and pion (π) hadrons discovered in cosmic rays in 1947.

In a 1970 paper, Glashow, John Iliopoulos and Luciano Maiani presented the GIM mechanism (named from their initials) to explain the experimental non-observation of flavor-changing neutral currents. This theoretical model required the existence of the as-yet undiscovered charm quark. The number of supposed quark flavors grew to the current six in 1973, when Makoto Kobayashi and Toshihide Maskawa noted that the experimental observation of CP violation (Note: CP violation is a phenomenon that causes weak interactions to behave differently when left and right are swapped (P symmetry) and particles are replaced with their corresponding antiparticles (C symmetry).) could be explained if there were another pair of quarks.

Charm quarks were produced almost simultaneously by two teams in November 1974 (see November Revolution)—one at SLAC under Burton Richter, and one at Brookhaven National Laboratory under Samuel Ting. The charm quarks were observed bound with charm antiquarks in mesons. The two parties had assigned the discovered meson two different symbols, J and ψ; thus, it became formally known as the J/ψ meson. The discovery finally convinced the physics community of the quark model's validity.

In the following years a number of suggestions appeared for extending the quark model to six quarks. Of these, the 1975 paper by Haim Harari was the first to coin the terms top and bottom for the additional quarks.

In 1977, the bottom quark was observed by a team at Fermilab led by Leon Lederman. This was a strong indicator of the top quark's existence: without the top quark, the bottom quark would have been without a partner. It was not until 1995 that the top quark was finally observed, also by the CDF and DØ teams at Fermilab. It had a mass much larger than expected, almost as large as that of a gold atom.

== Etymology ==
For some time, Gell-Mann was undecided on an actual spelling for the term he intended to coin, until he found the word quark in James Joyce's 1939 book Finnegans Wake:

– Three quarks for Muster Mark!
Sure he hasn't got much of a bark
And sure any he has it's all beside the mark.

The word quark is an old English word meaning to croak and the above-quoted lines are about a bird choir mocking king Mark of Cornwall in the legend of Tristan and Iseult. Especially in the German-speaking parts of the world there is a widespread legend, however, that Joyce had taken it from the word Quark, a German word of Slavic origin which denotes a curd cheese, but is also a colloquial term for "trivial nonsense". In the legend it is said that he had heard it on a journey to Germany at a farmers' market in Freiburg. Some authors, however, defend a possible German origin of Joyce's word quark. Gell-Mann went into further detail regarding the name of the quark in his 1994 book The Quark and the Jaguar:

In 1963, when I assigned the name "quark" to the fundamental constituents of the nucleon, I had the sound first, without the spelling, which could have been "kwork". Then, in one of my occasional perusals of Finnegans Wake, by James Joyce, I came across the word "quark" in the phrase "Three quarks for Muster Mark". Since "quark" (meaning, for one thing, the cry of the gull) was clearly intended to rhyme with "Mark", as well as "bark" and other such words, I had to find an excuse to pronounce it as "kwork". But the book represents the dream of a publican named Humphrey Chimpden Earwicker. Words in the text are typically drawn from several sources at once, like the "portmanteau" words in Through the Looking-Glass. From time to time, phrases occur in the book that are partially determined by calls for drinks at the bar. I argued, therefore, that perhaps one of the multiple sources of the cry "Three quarks for Muster Mark" might be "Three quarts for Mister Mark", in which case the pronunciation "kwork" would not be totally unjustified. In any case, the number three fitted perfectly the way quarks occur in nature.

Zweig preferred the name ace for the particle he had theorized, but Gell-Mann's terminology came to prominence once the quark model had been commonly accepted.

The quark flavors were given their names for several reasons. The up and down quarks are named after the up and down components of isospin, which they carry. Strange quarks were given their name because they were discovered to be components of the strange particles discovered in cosmic rays years before the quark model was proposed; these particles were deemed "strange" because they had unusually long lifetimes. Glashow, who co-proposed the charm quark with Bjorken, is quoted as saying, "We called our construct the 'charmed quark', for we were fascinated and pleased by the symmetry it brought to the subnuclear world." The names "top" and "bottom", coined by Harari, were chosen because they are "logical partners for up and down quarks". Alternative names for top and bottom quarks are "truth" and "beauty", (Note: "Beauty" and "truth" are contrasted in the last lines of Keats' 1819 poem "Ode on a Grecian Urn" and may have been the origin of those names.) but these names have somewhat fallen out of use. While "truth" never did catch on, accelerator complexes devoted to massive production of bottom quarks are sometimes called "beauty factories".

== Properties ==
=== Electric charge ===
Quarks have fractional electric charge values, either −1/3, or +2/3 times the elementary charge (e), depending on flavor. Up, charm, and top quarks (collectively referred to as up-type quarks) have a charge of +2/3 e; down, strange, and bottom quarks (down-type quarks) have a charge of −1/3 e. Antiquarks have the opposite charge to their corresponding quarks; up-type antiquarks have charges of −2/3 e and down-type antiquarks have charges of +1/3 e. Since the electric charge of a hadron is the sum of the charges of the constituent quarks, all hadrons have integer charges: the combination of three quarks (baryons), three antiquarks (antibaryons), or a quark and an antiquark (mesons) always results in integer charges. For example, the hadron constituents of atomic nuclei, neutrons and protons, have charges of 0 e and +1 e, respectively; the neutron is composed of two down quarks and one up quark, and the proton of two up quarks and one down quark.

=== Spin ===
Spin is an intrinsic property of elementary particles, and its direction is an important degree of freedom. It is sometimes visualized as the rotation of an object around its own axis (hence the name "spin"), though this notion is somewhat misguided at subatomic scales because elementary particles are believed to be point-like.

Spin can be represented by a vector whose length is measured in units of the reduced Planck constant ħ (pronounced "h bar"). For quarks, a measurement of the spin vector component along any axis can only yield the values +ħ/2 or −ħ/2; for this reason quarks are classified as spin-1/2 particles. The component of spin along a given axis—by convention the z axis—is often denoted by an up arrow ↑ for the value +1/2 and a down arrow ↓ for the value −1/2, placed after the symbol for flavor. For example, an up quark with a spin of +1/2 along the z axis is denoted by u↑.

=== Weak interaction ===
Feynman diagram of beta decay of a neutron into a proton, electron, and electron antineutrino via a virtual W^{−} boson. Time is flowing upwards. The CKM matrix (discussed below) encodes the probability of this and other quark decays.

A quark of one flavor can transform into a quark of another flavor only through the weak interaction, one of the four fundamental interactions in particle physics. By absorbing or emitting a W boson, any up-type quark (up, charm, and top quarks) can change into any down-type quark (down, strange, and bottom quarks) and vice versa. This flavor transformation mechanism causes the radioactive process of beta decay, in which a neutron (n) "splits" into a proton (p), an electron (e^{−}) and an electron antineutrino (ν̅_{e}) (see picture). This occurs when one of the down quarks in the neutron (udd) decays into an up quark by emitting a virtual W^{−} boson, transforming the neutron into a proton (uud). The W^{−} boson then decays into an electron and an electron antineutrino.

n	→	p	+	e^{−}	+	ν̅_{e}	(beta decay, hadron notation)
udd	→	uud	+	e^{−}	+	ν̅_{e}	(beta decay, quark notation)

Both beta decay and the inverse process of inverse beta decay are routinely used in medical applications such as positron emission tomography (PET) and in experiments involving neutrino detection.

The strengths of the weak interactions between the six quarks. The "intensities" of the lines are determined by the elements of the CKM matrix.

While the process of flavor transformation is the same for all quarks, each quark has a preference to transform into the quark of its own generation. The relative tendencies of all flavor transformations are described by a mathematical table, called the Cabibbo–Kobayashi–Maskawa matrix (CKM matrix). Enforcing unitarity, the approximate magnitudes of the entries of the CKM matrix are:

$$\begin{bmatrix} |V_\mathrm {ud}| & |V_\mathrm {us}| & |V_\mathrm {ub}| \\ |V_\mathrm {cd}| & |V_\mathrm {cs}| & |V_\mathrm {cb}| \\ |V_\mathrm {td}| & |V_\mathrm {ts}| & |V_\mathrm {tb}| \end{bmatrix} \approx
\begin{bmatrix} 0.974 & 0.225 & 0.003 \\ 0.225 & 0.973 & 0.041 \\ 0.009 & 0.040 & 0.999 \end{bmatrix},$$

where V_{ij} represents the tendency of a quark of flavor i to change into a quark of flavor j (or vice versa). (Note: The actual probability of decay of one quark to another is a complicated function of (among other variables) the decaying quark's mass, the masses of the decay products, and the corresponding element of the CKM matrix. This probability is directly proportional (but not equal) to the magnitude squared (|V_{ij}|^{2}) of the corresponding CKM entry.)

There exists an equivalent weak interaction matrix for leptons (right side of the W boson on the above beta decay diagram), called the Pontecorvo–Maki–Nakagawa–Sakata matrix (PMNS matrix). Together, the CKM and PMNS matrices describe all flavor transformations, but the links between the two are not yet clear.

=== Strong interaction and color charge ===
All types of hadrons have zero total color charge.

The pattern of strong charges for the three colors of quark, three antiquarks, and eight gluons (with two of zero charge overlapping).

According to quantum chromodynamics (QCD), quarks possess a property called color charge. There are three types of color charge, arbitrarily labeled blue, green, and red. (Note: Despite its name, color charge is not related to the color spectrum of visible light.) Each of them is complemented by an anticolor—antiblue, antigreen, and antired. Every quark carries a color, while every antiquark carries an anticolor.

The system of attraction and repulsion between quarks charged with different combinations of the three colors is called strong interaction, which is mediated by force carrying particles known as gluons; this is discussed at length below. The theory that describes strong interactions is called quantum chromodynamics (QCD). A quark, which will have a single color value, can form a bound system with an antiquark carrying the corresponding anticolor. The result of two attracting quarks will be color neutrality: a quark with color charge ξ plus an antiquark with color charge −ξ will result in a color charge of 0 (or "white" color) and the formation of a meson. This is analogous to the additive color model in basic optics. Similarly, the combination of three quarks, each with different color charges, or three antiquarks, each with different anticolor charges, will result in the same "white" color charge and the formation of a baryon or antibaryon.

In modern particle physics, gauge symmetries—a kind of symmetry group—relate interactions between particles (see gauge theories). Color SU(3) (commonly abbreviated to SU(3)_{c}) is the gauge symmetry that relates the color charge in quarks and is the defining symmetry for quantum chromodynamics. Just as the laws of physics are independent of which directions in space are designated x, y, and z, and remain unchanged if the coordinate axes are rotated to a new orientation, the physics of quantum chromodynamics is independent of which directions in three-dimensional color space are identified as blue, red, and green. SU(3)_{c} color transformations correspond to "rotations" in color space (which, mathematically speaking, is a complex space). Every quark flavor f, each with subtypes f_{B}, f_{G}, f_{R} corresponding to the quark colors, forms a triplet: a three-component quantum field that transforms under the fundamental representation of SU(3)_{c}. The requirement that SU(3)_{c} should be local—that is, that its transformations be allowed to vary with space and time—determines the properties of the strong interaction. In particular, it implies the existence of eight gluon types to act as its force carriers.

=== Mass ===
Current quark masses for all six flavors in comparison, as balls of proportional volumes. Proton (gray) and electron (red) are shown in bottom left corner for scale.

Two terms are used in referring to a quark's mass: current quark mass refers to the mass of a quark by itself, while constituent quark mass refers to the current quark mass plus the mass of the gluon particle field surrounding the quark. These masses typically have very different values. Most of a hadron's mass comes from the gluons that bind the constituent quarks together, rather than from the quarks themselves. While gluons are inherently massless, they possess energy—more specifically, quantum chromodynamics binding energy (QCBE)—and it is this that contributes so greatly to the overall mass of the hadron (see mass in special relativity). For example, a proton has a mass of approximately 938 MeV/c^{2}, of which the rest mass of its three valence quarks only contributes about 9 MeV/c^{2}; much of the remainder can be attributed to the field energy of the gluons (see chiral symmetry breaking). The Standard Model posits that elementary particles derive their masses from the Higgs mechanism, which is associated to the Higgs boson. It is hoped that further research into the reasons for the top quark's large mass of ~173 GeV/c^{2}, almost the mass of a gold atom, might reveal more about the origin of the mass of quarks and other elementary particles.

=== Size ===
In QCD, quarks are considered to be point-like entities, with no structure. As of 2014, experimental evidence indicates they have no structure greater than 10^{−4} times the size of a proton, i.e. less than 10^{−19} m.

=== Table of properties ===
The following table summarizes the key properties of the six quarks. Flavor quantum numbers (isospin (I_{3}), charm (C), strangeness (S, not to be confused with spin), topness (T), and bottomness (B′)) are assigned to certain quark flavors, and denote qualities of quark-based systems and hadrons. The baryon number (B) is +1/3 for all quarks, as baryons are made of three quarks. For antiquarks, the electric charge (Q) and all flavor quantum numbers (B, I_{3}, C, S, T, and B′) are of opposite sign. Mass and total angular momentum (J; equal to spin for point particles) do not change sign for the antiquarks.

Quark flavor properties
Particle		Mass^{*} [MeV/c^{2}]	J [ħ]	B	Q [e]	I_{3}	C	S	T	B′	Antiparticle	
Name	Symbol	Mass^{*} [MeV/c^{2}]	J [ħ]	B	Q [e]	I_{3}	C	S	T	B′	Name	Symbol
First generation
up	u	2.3±0.7 ± 0.5	1/2	+1/3	+2/3	+1/2	0	0	0	0	antiup	u̅
down	d	4.8±0.5 ± 0.3	1/2	+1/3	−1/3	−1/2	0	0	0	0	antidown	d̅
Second generation
charm	c	1275±25	1/2	+1/3	+2/3	0	+1	0	0	0	anticharm	c̅
strange	s	95±5	1/2	+1/3	−1/3	0	0	−1	0	0	antistrange	s̅
Third generation
top	t	173210±510 ± 710 *	1/2	+1/3	+2/3	0	0	0	+1	0	antitop	t̅
bottom	b	4180±30	1/2	+1/3	−1/3	0	0	0	0	−1	antibottom	b̅

J: total angular momentum, B: baryon number, Q: electric charge, I_{3}: isospin, C: charm, S: strangeness, T: topness, B′: bottomness.
* Notation such as 173210±510 ± 710, in the case of the top quark, denotes two types of measurement uncertainty: The first uncertainty is statistical in nature, and the second is systematic.

== Interacting quarks ==
As described by quantum chromodynamics, the strong interaction between quarks is mediated by gluons, massless vector gauge bosons. Each gluon carries one color charge and one anticolor charge. In the standard framework of particle interactions (part of a more general formulation known as perturbation theory), gluons are constantly exchanged between quarks through a virtual emission and absorption process. When a gluon is transferred between quarks, a color change occurs in both; for example, if a red quark emits a red–antigreen gluon, it becomes green, and if a green quark absorbs a red–antigreen gluon, it becomes red. Therefore, while each quark's color constantly changes, their strong interaction is preserved.

Since gluons carry color charge, they themselves are able to emit and absorb other gluons. This causes asymptotic freedom: as quarks come closer to each other, the chromodynamic binding force between them weakens. Conversely, as the distance between quarks increases, the binding force strengthens. The color field becomes stressed, much as an elastic band is stressed when stretched, and more gluons of appropriate color are spontaneously created to strengthen the field. Above a certain energy threshold, pairs of quarks and antiquarks are created. These pairs bind with the quarks being separated, causing new hadrons to form. This phenomenon is known as color confinement: quarks never appear in isolation. This process of hadronization occurs before quarks formed in a high energy collision are able to interact in any other way. The only exception is the top quark, which may decay before it hadronizes.

=== Sea quarks ===
Hadrons contain, along with the valence quarks (q_{v}) that contribute to their quantum numbers, virtual quark–antiquark (qq̅) pairs known as sea quarks (q_{s}). Sea quarks form when a gluon of the hadron's color field splits; this process also works in reverse in that the annihilation of two sea quarks produces a gluon. The result is a constant flux of gluon splits and creations colloquially known as "the sea". Sea quarks are much less stable than their valence counterparts, and they typically annihilate each other within the interior of the hadron. Despite this, sea quarks can hadronize into baryonic or mesonic particles under certain circumstances.

=== Other phases of quark matter ===
A qualitative rendering of the phase diagram of quark matter. The precise details of the diagram are the subject of ongoing research.

Under sufficiently extreme conditions, quarks may become "deconfined" out of bound states and propagate as thermalized "free" excitations in the larger medium. In the course of asymptotic freedom, the strong interaction becomes weaker at increasing temperatures. Eventually, color confinement would be effectively lost in an extremely hot plasma of freely moving quarks and gluons. This theoretical phase of matter is called quark–gluon plasma.

The exact conditions needed to give rise to this state are unknown and have been the subject of a great deal of speculation and experimentation. An estimate puts the needed temperature at (1.90±0.02)×10^{12} kelvin. While a state of entirely free quarks and gluons has never been achieved (despite numerous attempts by CERN in the 1980s and 1990s), recent experiments at the Relativistic Heavy Ion Collider have yielded evidence for liquid-like quark matter exhibiting "nearly perfect" fluid motion.

The quark–gluon plasma would be characterized by a great increase in the number of heavier quark pairs in relation to the number of up and down quark pairs. It is believed that in the period prior to 10^{−6} seconds after the Big Bang (the quark epoch), the universe was filled with quark–gluon plasma, as the temperature was too high for hadrons to be stable.

Given sufficiently high baryon densities and relatively low temperatures—possibly comparable to those found in neutron stars—quark matter is expected to degenerate into a Fermi liquid of weakly interacting quarks. This liquid would be characterized by a condensation of colored quark Cooper pairs, thereby breaking the local SU(3)_{c} symmetry. Because quark Cooper pairs harbor color charge, such a phase of quark matter would be color superconductive; that is, color charge would be able to pass through it with no resistance.

== See also ==
- Color–flavor locking
- Koide formula
- Nucleon magnetic moment
- Preons
- Quarkonium
- Quark star
- Quark–lepton complementarity
