= Hadron =

Composite subatomic particle

A hadron is a composite subatomic particle. Every hadron must fall into one of the two fundamental classes of particle, bosons and fermions.

In particle physics, a hadron is a composite subatomic particle made of two or more quarks that are held together by the strong nuclear force. Pronounced /ˈhædrɒn/, the name is derived from Ancient Greek ἁδρός (hadrós) 'stout, thick'. They are analogous to molecules, which are held together by the electromagnetic force. Most of the mass of ordinary matter comes from two hadrons: the proton and the neutron, while most of the mass of the protons and neutrons is in turn due to the binding energy of their constituent quarks, due to the strong force.

Hadrons are categorized into two broad families: baryons, made of an odd number of quarks (usually three), and mesons, made of an even number of quarks (usually two: one quark and one antiquark). Protons and neutrons (which make the majority of the mass of an atom) are examples of baryons; pions are an example of a meson. A tetraquark state (an exotic meson), named the Z(4430)^{−}, was discovered in 2007 by the Belle Collaboration and confirmed as a resonance in 2014 by the LHCb collaboration. Two pentaquark states (exotic baryons), named P^{+}_{c}(4380) and P^{+}_{c}(4450), were discovered in 2015 by the LHCb collaboration. There are several other "Exotic" hadron candidates and other colour-singlet quark combinations that may also exist.

Almost all "free" hadrons and antihadrons (meaning, in isolation and not bound within an atomic nucleus) are believed to be unstable and eventually decay into other particles. The only known possible exception is free protons, which appear to be stable, or at least, take immense amounts of time to decay (order of 10^{34+} years). By way of comparison, free neutrons are the longest-lived unstable particle, and decay with a half-life of about 611 seconds, and have a mean lifetime of 879 seconds (Note: The proton's and neutron's respective antiparticles are expected to follow the same pattern, but they are difficult to capture and study, because they immediately annihilate on contact with ordinary matter.) (see Free neutron decay).

Hadron physics is studied by colliding hadrons, e.g. protons, with each other or the nuclei of dense, heavy elements, such as lead (Pb) or gold (Au), and detecting the debris in the produced particle showers. A similar process occurs in the natural environment, in the extreme upper-atmosphere, where muons and mesons such as pions are produced by the collisions of cosmic rays with rarefied gas particles in the outer atmosphere.

== Terminology and etymology ==
The term "hadron" is a new Greek word introduced by L. B. Okun in a plenary talk at the 1962 International Conference on High Energy Physics at CERN. He opened his talk with the definition of a new category term:

Notwithstanding the fact that this report deals with weak interactions, we shall frequently have to speak of strongly interacting particles. These particles pose not only numerous scientific problems, but also a terminological problem. The point is that "strongly interacting particles" is a very clumsy term which does not yield itself to the formation of an adjective. For this reason, to take but one instance, decays into strongly interacting particles are called "non-leptonic". This definition is not exact because "non-leptonic" may also signify photonic. In this report I shall call strongly interacting particles "hadrons", and the corresponding decays "hadronic" (the Greek ἁδρός signifies "large", "massive", in contrast to λεπτός which means "small", "light"). I hope that this terminology will prove to be convenient. — L. B. Okun (1962)

== Properties ==
All types of hadrons have zero total color charge (three examples shown).

According to the quark model, the properties of hadrons are primarily determined by their so-called valence quarks. For example, a proton is composed of two up quarks (each with electric charge + 2/3 e, for a total of +4/3 e together) and one down quark (with electric charge − 1/3 e). Adding these together yields the proton charge of +1 e. Although quarks also carry color charge, hadrons must have zero total color charge because of a phenomenon called color confinement. That is, hadrons must be "colorless" or "white". The simplest ways for this to occur are with a quark of one color and an antiquark of the corresponding anticolor, or three quarks of different colors. Hadrons with the first arrangement are a type of meson, and those with the second arrangement are a type of baryon.

Massless virtual gluons compose the overwhelming majority of particles inside hadrons, as well as the major constituents of its mass (with the exception of the heavy charm and bottom quarks; the top quark vanishes before it has time to bind into a hadron). The strength of the strong-force gluons which bind the quarks together has sufficient energy (E) to have resonances composed of massive (m) quarks (E ≥ mc^{2}). One outcome is that short-lived pairs of virtual quarks and antiquarks are continually forming and vanishing again inside a hadron. Because the virtual quarks are not stable wave packets (quanta), but an irregular and transient phenomenon, it is not meaningful to ask which quark is real and which virtual; only the small excess is apparent from the outside in the form of a hadron. Therefore, when a hadron or anti-hadron is stated to consist of (typically) two or three quarks, this technically refers to the constant excess of quarks versus antiquarks.

Like all subatomic particles, hadrons are assigned quantum numbers corresponding to the representations of the Poincaré group: J^{PC} (m), where J is the spin quantum number, P the intrinsic parity (or P-parity), C the charge conjugation (or C-parity), and m is the particle's mass. Note that the mass of a hadron has very little to do with the mass of its valence quarks; rather, due to mass–energy equivalence, most of the mass comes from the large amount of energy associated with the strong interaction. Hadrons may also carry flavor quantum numbers such as isospin (G-parity), and strangeness. All quarks carry an additive, conserved quantum number called a baryon number (B), which is + 1/3 e for quarks and − 1/3 e for antiquarks. This means that baryons (composite particles made of three, five or a larger odd number of quarks) have B = 1 whereas mesons have B = 0.

Hadrons have excited states known as resonances. Each ground state hadron may have several excited states; several hundred different resonances have been observed in experiments. Resonances decay extremely quickly (within about 10^{−24} s) via the strong nuclear force.

In other phases of matter the hadrons may disappear. For example, at very high temperature and high pressure, unless there are sufficiently many flavors of quarks, the theory of quantum chromodynamics (QCD) predicts that quarks and gluons will no longer be confined within hadrons, "because the strength of the strong interaction diminishes with energy". This property, which is known as asymptotic freedom, has been experimentally confirmed in the energy range between 1 GeV (gigaelectronvolt) and 1 TeV (teraelectronvolt). All free hadrons except (possibly) the proton and antiproton are unstable.

== Baryons ==
Baryons are hadrons containing an odd number of valence quarks (at least 3). Most well-known baryons such as the proton and neutron have three valence quarks, but pentaquarks with five quarks—three quarks of different colors, and also one extra quark-antiquark pair—have also been proven to exist. Because baryons have an odd number of quarks, they are also all fermions, i.e., they have half-integer spin. As quarks possess baryon number B = 1/3, baryons have baryon number B = 1. Pentaquarks also have B = 1, since the extra quark's and antiquark's baryon numbers cancel.

Each type of baryon has a corresponding antiparticle (antibaryon) in which quarks are replaced by their corresponding antiquarks. For example, just as a proton is made of two up quarks and one down quark, its corresponding antiparticle, the antiproton, is made of two up antiquarks and one down antiquark.

As of August 2015, there are two known pentaquarks, P^{+}_{c}(4380) and P^{+}_{c}(4450), both discovered in 2015 by the LHCb collaboration.

== Mesons ==
Mesons are hadrons containing an even number of valence quarks (at least two). Most well known mesons are composed of a quark–antiquark pair, but possible tetraquarks (four quarks) and hexaquarks (six quarks, comprising either a dibaryon or three quark–antiquark pairs) may have been discovered and are being investigated to confirm their nature. Several other hypothetical types of exotic meson may exist which do not fall within the quark model of classification. These include glueballs and hybrid mesons (mesons bound by excited gluons).

Because mesons have an even number of quarks, they are also all bosons, with integer spin, i.e., 0 ħ, +1 ħ, or −1 ħ. They have baryon number B = 1/3 − 1/3 = 0. Examples of mesons commonly produced in particle physics experiments include pions and kaons. Pions also play a role in holding atomic nuclei together via the residual strong force.

== See also ==
- Exotic hadron
- Hadron therapy, a.k.a. particle therapy
- Hadronization, the formation of hadrons out of quarks and gluons
- Large Hadron Collider (LHC)
- List of particles
- List of baryons
- List of mesons
- Standard Model
- Subatomic particle
