= Baryon =

Hadron (subatomic particle) that is composed of three quarks

In particle physics, a baryon is a type of composite subatomic particle that contains an odd number of valence quarks, conventionally three. Protons and neutrons are examples of baryons; because baryons are composed of quarks, they belong to the hadron family of particles. Baryons are also classified as fermions because they have half-integer spin.

The name "baryon", introduced by Abraham Pais, comes from the Greek word for "heavy" (βαρύς, barýs), because, at the time of their naming, most known elementary particles had lower masses than the baryons. Each baryon has a corresponding antiparticle (antibaryon) where their corresponding antiquarks replace quarks. For example, a proton is made of two up quarks and one down quark; and its corresponding antiparticle, the antiproton, is made of two up antiquarks and one down antiquark.

Baryons participate in the residual strong force, which is mediated by particles known as mesons. The most familiar baryons are protons and neutrons. These particles make up most of the mass of the visible matter in the universe and compose the nucleus of every atom (electrons, the other major component of the atom, are members of a different family of particles called leptons; leptons do not interact via the strong force). Exotic baryons containing five quarks, called pentaquarks, have also been discovered and studied.

A census of the Universe's baryons indicates that 10% of them could be found inside galaxies, 50% to 60% in the circumgalactic medium, and the remaining 30% to 40% could be located in the warm–hot intergalactic medium (WHIM).

== Background ==
Hadrons, like the proton and neutron, are bound states of quarks. Baryons are hadrons that consist of three quarks. Anti-baryons consist of three anti-quarks. The only other kind of hadron is a meson, a combination of one quark and one antiquark.

Baryons are strongly interacting fermions; that is, they are acted on by the strong nuclear force and are described by Fermi–Dirac statistics, which apply to all particles obeying the Pauli exclusion principle. This is in contrast to the bosons, which do not obey the exclusion principle. Quarks have baryon numbers of B = 1/3 and antiquarks have baryon numbers of B = −1/3. The term "baryon" usually refers to triquarks—baryons made of three quarks (B = 1/3 + 1/3 + 1/3 = 1).

== Baryonic matter ==
Nearly all matter that may be encountered or experienced in everyday life is baryonic matter, which includes atoms of any sort, and provides them with the property of mass. Non-baryonic matter, as implied by the name, is any sort of matter that is not composed primarily of baryons. This might include neutrinos and free electrons, various dark matter candidates, supersymmetric particles, axions, and black holes.

The very existence of baryons is also a significant issue in cosmology because it is assumed that the Big Bang produced a state with equal amounts of baryons and antibaryons. The process by which baryons came to outnumber their antiparticles is called baryogenesis.

== Baryogenesis ==
Experiments are consistent with the number of quarks in the universe being conserved alongside the total baryon number, with antibaryons being counted as negative quantities. Within the prevailing Standard Model of particle physics, the number of baryons may change in multiples of three due to the action of sphalerons, although this is rare and has not been observed under experiment. Some Grand Unified Theories of particle physics also predict that a single proton can decay, changing the baryon number by one; however, this has not yet been observed under experiment. The excess of baryons over antibaryons in the present universe is thought to be due to non-conservation of baryon number in the very early universe, though this is not well understood.

== Properties ==
=== Isospin and charge ===
Combinations of three u, d or s quarks forming baryons with a spin-3/2 form the uds baryon decuplet

Combinations of three u, d or s quarks forming baryons with a spin-1/2 form the uds baryon octet

The concept of isospin was first proposed by Werner Heisenberg in 1932 to explain the similarities between protons and neutrons under the strong interaction. Although they had different electric charges, their masses were so similar that physicists believed they were the same particle. The different electric charges were explained as being the result of some unknown excitation similar to spin. This unknown excitation was later dubbed isospin by Eugene Wigner in 1937.

This belief lasted until Murray Gell-Mann proposed the quark model in 1964 (containing originally only the u, d, and s quarks). The success of the isospin model is now understood to be the result of the similar masses of u and d quarks. Since u and d quarks have similar masses, particles made of the same number then also have similar masses. The exact specific u and d quark composition determines the charge, as u quarks carry charge +2/3 while d quarks carry charge −1/3. For example, the four Deltas all have different charges (Δ^{++} (uuu), Δ^{+} (uud), Δ^{0} (udd), Δ^{−} (ddd)), but have similar masses (~1,232 MeV/c^{2}) as they are each made of a combination of three u or d quarks. Under the isospin model, they were considered to be a single particle in different charged states.

The mathematics of isospin was modeled after that of spin. Isospin projections varied in increments of 1 just like those of spin, and to each projection was associated a "charged state". Since the "Delta particle" had four "charged states", it was said to be of isospin I = 3/2. Its "charged states" Δ^{++}, Δ^{+}, Δ^{0}, and Δ^{−}, corresponded to the isospin projections I_{3} = +3/2, I_{3} = +1/2, I_{3} = −1/2, and I_{3} = −3/2, respectively. Another example is the "nucleon particle". As there were two nucleon "charged states", it was said to be of isospin 1/2. The positive nucleon N^{+} (proton) was identified with I_{3} = +1/2 and the neutral nucleon N^{0} (neutron) with I_{3} = −1/2. It was later noted that the isospin projections were related to the up and down quark content of particles by the relation:

$$I_\mathrm{3}=\frac{1}{2}[(n_\mathrm{u}-n_\mathrm{\bar{u}})-(n_\mathrm{d}-n_\mathrm{\bar{d}})],$$

where the n is the number of up and down quarks and antiquarks.

In the "isospin picture", the four Deltas and the two nucleons were thought to be the different states of two particles. However, in the quark model, Deltas are different states of nucleons (the N^{++} or N^{−} are forbidden by Pauli's exclusion principle). Isospin, although conveying an inaccurate picture of things, is still used to classify baryons, leading to unnatural and often confusing nomenclature.

=== Flavour quantum numbers ===
The strangeness flavour quantum number S (not to be confused with spin) was noticed to go up and down along with particle mass. The higher the mass, the lower the strangeness (the more s quarks). Particles could be described with isospin projections (related to charge) and strangeness (mass) (see the uds octet and decuplet figures on the right). As other quarks were discovered, new quantum numbers were made to have similar description of udc and udb octets and decuplets. Since only the u and d mass are similar, this description of particle mass and charge in terms of isospin and flavour quantum numbers works well only for octet and decuplet made of one u, one d, and one other quark, and breaks down for the other octets and decuplets (for example, ucb octet and decuplet). If the quarks all had the same mass, their behaviour would be called symmetric, as they would all behave in the same way to the strong interaction. Since quarks do not have the same mass, they do not interact in the same way (exactly like an electron placed in an electric field will accelerate more than a proton placed in the same field because of its lighter mass), and the symmetry is said to be broken.

It was noted that charge (Q) was related to the isospin projection (I_{3}), the baryon number (B) and flavour quantum numbers (S, C, B′, T) by the Gell-Mann–Nishijima formula:

$$Q = I_3 +\frac{1}{2}\left(B + S + C + B^\prime + T\right),$$

where S, C, B′, and T represent the strangeness, charm, bottomness and topness flavour quantum numbers, respectively. They are related to the number of strange, charm, bottom, and top quarks and antiquark according to the relations:

$$\begin{align}
S &= -\left(n_\mathrm{s} - n_\mathrm{\bar{s}}\right), \\
C &= +\left(n_\mathrm{c} - n_\mathrm{\bar{c}}\right), \\
B^\prime &= -\left(n_\mathrm{b} - n_\mathrm{\bar{b}}\right), \\
T &= +\left(n_\mathrm{t} - n_\mathrm{\bar{t}}\right),
\end{align}$$

meaning that the Gell-Mann–Nishijima formula is equivalent to the expression of charge in terms of quark content:

$$Q = \frac{2}{3}\left[(n_\mathrm{u} - n_\mathrm{\bar{u}}) + (n_\mathrm{c} - n_\mathrm{\bar{c}}) + (n_\mathrm{t} - n_\mathrm{\bar{t}})\right] - \frac{1}{3}\left[(n_\mathrm{d} - n_\mathrm{\bar{d}}) + (n_\mathrm{s} - n_\mathrm{\bar{s}}) + (n_\mathrm{b} - n_\mathrm{\bar{b}})\right].$$

=== Spin, orbital angular momentum, and total angular momentum ===
Spin (quantum number S) is a vector quantity that represents the "intrinsic" angular momentum of a particle. It comes in increments of 1/2 ħ (pronounced "h-bar"). The ħ is often dropped because it is the "fundamental" unit of spin, and it is implied that "spin 1" means "spin 1 ħ". In some systems of natural units, ħ is chosen to be 1, and therefore does not appear anywhere.

Quarks are fermionic particles of spin 1/2 (S = 1/2). Because spin projections vary in increments of 1 (that is, 1 ħ), a single quark has a spin vector of length 1/2, and has two spin projections (S_{z} = +1/2 and S_{z} = −1/2). Two quarks can have their spins aligned, in which case the two spin vectors add to make a vector of length S = 1 and three spin projections (S_{z} = +1, S_{z} = 0, and S_{z} = −1). If two quarks have unaligned spins, the spin vectors add up to make a vector of length S = 0 and has only one spin projection (S_{z} = 0), etc. Since baryons are made of three quarks, their spin vectors can add to make a vector of length S = 3/2, which has four spin projections (S_{z} = +3/2, S_{z} = +1/2, S_{z} = −1/2, and S_{z} = −3/2), or a vector of length S = 1/2 with two spin projections (S_{z} = +1/2, and S_{z} = −1/2).

There is another quantity of angular momentum, called the orbital angular momentum (azimuthal quantum number L), that comes in increments of 1 ħ, which represent the angular moment due to quarks orbiting around each other. The total angular momentum (total angular momentum quantum number J) of a particle is therefore the combination of intrinsic angular momentum (spin) and orbital angular momentum. It can take any value from J = |L − S| to J = |L + S|, in increments of 1.

Baryon angular momentum quantum numbers for L = 0, 1, 2, 3
Spin, S	Orbital angular momentum, L	Total angular momentum, J	Parity, P	Condensed notation, J^{P}
1/2	0	1/2	+	1/2^{+}
1/2	1	3/2, 1/2	−	3/2^{−}, 1/2^{−}
1/2	2	5/2, 3/2	+	5/2^{+}, 3/2^{+}
1/2	3	7/2, 5/2	−	7/2^{−}, 5/2^{−}
3/2	0	3/2	+	3/2^{+}
3/2	1	5/2, 3/2, 1/2	−	5/2^{−}, 3/2^{−}, 1/2^{−}
3/2	2	7/2, 5/2, 3/2, 1/2	+	7/2^{+}, 5/2^{+}, 3/2^{+}, 1/2^{+}
3/2	3	9/2, 7/2, 5/2, 3/2	−	9/2^{−}, 7/2^{−}, 5/2^{−}, 3/2^{−}

Particle physicists are most interested in baryons with no orbital angular momentum (L = 0), as they correspond to ground states—states of minimal energy. Therefore, the two groups of baryons most studied are the S = 1/2; L = 0 and S = 3/2; L = 0, which corresponds to J = 1/2^{+} and J = 3/2^{+}, respectively, although they are not the only ones. It is also possible to obtain J = 3/2^{+} particles from S = 1/2 and L = 2, as well as S = 3/2 and L = 2. This phenomenon of having multiple particles in the same total angular momentum configuration is called degeneracy. How to distinguish between these degenerate baryons is an active area of research in baryon spectroscopy.

=== Parity ===
If the universe were reflected in a mirror, most of the laws of physics would be identical—things would behave the same way regardless of what we call "left" and what we call "right". This concept of mirror reflection is called "intrinsic parity" or simply "parity" (P). Gravity, the electromagnetic force, and the strong interaction all behave in the same way regardless of whether or not the universe is reflected in a mirror, and thus are said to conserve parity (P-symmetry). However, the weak interaction does distinguish "left" from "right", a phenomenon called parity violation (P-violation).

Based on this, if the wavefunction for each particle (in more precise terms, the quantum field for each particle type) were simultaneously mirror-reversed, then the new set of wavefunctions would perfectly satisfy the laws of physics (apart from the weak interaction). It turns out that this is not quite true: for the equations to be satisfied, the wavefunctions of certain types of particles have to be multiplied by −1, in addition to being mirror-reversed. Such particle types are said to have negative or odd parity (P = −1, or alternatively P = –), while the other particles are said to have positive or even parity (P = +1, or alternatively P = +).

For baryons, the parity is related to the orbital angular momentum by the relation:

$$P=(-1)^L .$$

As a consequence, baryons with no orbital angular momentum (L = 0) all have even parity (P = +).

== Nomenclature ==
Baryons are classified into groups according to their isospin (I) values and quark (q) content. There are six groups of baryons: nucleon (N), Delta (Δ), Lambda (Λ), Sigma (Σ), Xi (Ξ), and Omega (Ω). The rules for classification are defined by the Particle Data Group. These rules consider the up (u), down (d) and strange (s) quarks to be light and the charm (c), bottom (b), and top (t) quarks to be heavy. The rules cover all the particles that can be made from three of each of the six quarks, even though baryons made of top quarks are not expected to exist because of the top quark's short lifetime. The rules do not cover pentaquarks.

- Baryons with (any combination of) three u and/or d quarks are Ns (I = 1/2) or Δ baryons (I = 3/2).
- Baryons containing two u and/or d quarks are Λ baryons (I = 0) or Σ baryons (I = 1). If the third quark is heavy, its identity is given by a subscript.
- Baryons containing one u or d quark are Ξ baryons (I = 1/2). One or two subscripts are used if one or both of the remaining quarks are heavy.
- Baryons containing no u or d quarks are Ω baryons (I = 0), and subscripts indicate any heavy quark content.
- Baryons that decay strongly have their masses as part of their names. For example, Σ^{0} does not decay strongly, but Δ^{++}(1232) does.

It is also a widespread (but not universal) practice to follow some additional rules when distinguishing between some states that would otherwise have the same symbol.

- Baryons in total angular momentum J = 3/2 configuration that have the same symbols as their J = 1/2 counterparts are denoted by an asterisk ( * ).
- Two baryons can be made of three different quarks in J = 1/2 configuration. In this case, a prime ( ′ ) is used to distinguish between them.
  - Exception: When two of the three quarks are one up and one down quark, one baryon is dubbed Λ while the other is dubbed Σ.

Quarks carry a charge, so knowing the charge of a particle indirectly gives the quark content. For example, the rules above say that a Λ^{+}_{c} contains a c quark and some combination of two u and/or d quarks. The c quark has a charge of (Q = +2/3), therefore the other two must be a u quark (Q = +2/3), and a d quark (Q = −1/3) to have the correct total charge (Q = +1).

== Baryon resonances ==
Exotic baryons have been proposed, such as pentaquarks—baryons made of four quarks and one antiquark (B = 1/3 + 1/3 + 1/3 + 1/3 − 1/3 = 1). The particle physics community as a whole did not view their existence as likely in 2006, and in 2008, considered evidence to be overwhelmingly against the existence of the reported pentaquarks. However, in July 2015, the LHCb experiment observed two resonances consistent with pentaquark states in the Λ^{0}_{b} → J/ψK^{−}p decay, with a combined statistical significance of 15σ.

In theory, heptaquarks (5 quarks, 2 antiquarks), nonaquarks (6 quarks, 3 antiquarks), etc. could also exist.

== See also ==
- Eightfold way
- List of baryons
- Meson
- Timeline of particle discoveries

== Bibliography ==
- MacQuart, J.-P.; Prochaska, J. X.; McQuinn, M.; Bannister, K. W.; Bhandari, S.; Day, C. K.; Deller, A. T.; Ekers, R. D.; James, C. W.; Marnoch, L.; Osłowski, S.; Phillips, C.; Ryder, S. D.; Scott, D. R.; Shannon, R. M.; Tejos, N. (2020). "A census of baryons in the Universe from localized fast radio bursts". Nature. 581 (7809): 391–395. arXiv:2005.13161. Bibcode:2020Natur.581..391M. doi:10.1038/s41586-020-2300-2. PMID 32461651.
- Shull, J. Michael; Smith, Britton D.; Danforth, Charles W. (2012). "The Baryon Census in a Multiphase Intergalactic Medium: 30% of the Baryons May Still be Missing". The Astrophysical Journal. 759 (1): 23. arXiv:1112.2706. Bibcode:2012ApJ...759...23S. doi:10.1088/0004-637X/759/1/23.
- C. Amsler et al. (Particle Data Group) (2008). "Review of Particle Physics" (PDF). Physics Letters B. 667 (1): 1–1340. Bibcode:2008PhLB..667....1A. doi:10.1016/j.physletb.2008.07.018. hdl:1854/LU-685594. PMID 10020536. S2CID 227119789. Archived (PDF) from the original on 2022-10-09.
- Garcilazo, H.; Vijande, J. & Valcarce, A. (2007). "Faddeev study of heavy-baryon spectroscopy". Journal of Physics G. 34 (5): 961–976. arXiv:hep-ph/0703257. Bibcode:2007hep.ph....3257G. doi:10.1088/0954-3899/34/5/014. S2CID 15445714.
- Carter, K. (2006). "The rise and fall of the pentaquark". Fermilab and SLAC. Archived from the original on 2007-07-08.
- W.-M. Yao et al. (Particle Data Group) (2006). "Review of Particle Physics". Journal of Physics G. 33 (1): 1–1232. arXiv:astro-ph/0601168. Bibcode:2006JPhG...33....1Y. doi:10.1088/0954-3899/33/1/001.
- Manley, D.M. (2005). "Status of baryon spectroscopy". Journal of Physics: Conference Series. 5 (1): 230–237. Bibcode:2005JPhCS...9..230M. doi:10.1088/1742-6596/9/1/043.
- Muir, H. (2003). "Pentaquark discovery confounds sceptics". New Scientist.
- Wong, S.S.M. (1998a). "Chapter 2 – Nucleon Structure". Introductory Nuclear Physics (2nd ed.). New York (NY): John Wiley & Sons. pp. 21–56. ISBN 978-0-471-23973-4.
- Wong, S.S.M. (1998b). "Chapter 3 – The Deuteron". Introductory Nuclear Physics (2nd ed.). New York (NY): John Wiley & Sons. pp. 57–104. ISBN 978-0-471-23973-4.
- Shankar, R. (1994). Principles of Quantum Mechanics (2nd ed.). New York (NY): Plenum Press. ISBN 978-0-306-44790-7.
- Wigner, E. (1937). "On the Consequences of the Symmetry of the Nuclear Hamiltonian on the Spectroscopy of Nuclei". Physical Review. 51 (2): 106–119. Bibcode:1937PhRv...51..106W. doi:10.1103/PhysRev.51.106.
- Gell-Mann, M. (1964). "A schematic model of baryons and mesons". Physics Letters. 8 (3): 214–215. Bibcode:1964PhL.....8..214G. doi:10.1016/S0031-9163(64)92001-3.
- Pais, A. (1953). "On the Baryon-meson-photon System". Progress of Theoretical Physics. 10 (4): 457–469. Bibcode:1953PThPh..10..457P. doi:10.1143/PTP.10.457.
- Heisenberg, W. (1932a). "Über den Bau der Atomkerne I". Zeitschrift für Physik (in German). 77 (1–2): 1–11. Bibcode:1932ZPhy...77....1H. doi:10.1007/BF01342433. S2CID 186218053.
- Heisenberg, W. (1932b). "Über den Bau der Atomkerne II". Zeitschrift für Physik (in German). 78 (3–4): 156–164. Bibcode:1932ZPhy...78..156H. doi:10.1007/BF01337585. S2CID 186221789.
- Heisenberg, W. (1932c). "Über den Bau der Atomkerne III". Zeitschrift für Physik (in German). 80 (9–10): 587–596. Bibcode:1933ZPhy...80..587H. doi:10.1007/BF01335696. S2CID 126422047.
