= X(3872) =

Subatomic particle

The X(3872) is an exotic meson candidate with a mass of 3871.68 MeV/c^{2} which does not fit into the quark model. It was first discovered in 2003 by the Belle experiment in Japan and later confirmed by several other experimental collaborations. Several theories have been proposed for its nature, such as a mesonic molecule or a diquark-antidiquark pair (tetraquark).

The quantum numbers of X(3872) have been determined by the LHCb experiment at CERN in March 2013. The values for J^{PC} are 1^{++}. The first evidence of X(3872) production in the quark–gluon plasma have been reported by the CMS experiment at CERN in January 2022.

== See also ==
- Meson
- XYZ particle
- Y(4140)
- Z(4430)
- Zc(3900)
