= Quarkonium =

Meson whose constituents are a quark and its own antiquark of the same flavor

In particle physics, quarkonium (from quark and -onium, pl. quarkonia) is a flavorless meson whose constituents are a heavy quark and its own antiquark, making it both a neutral particle and its own antiparticle. The name "quarkonium" is analogous to positronium, the bound state of electron and anti-electron. The particles are short-lived due to matter–antimatter annihilation.

== Light quarks ==
Light quarks (up, down, and strange) are much less massive than the heavier quarks, and so the physical states actually seen in experiments (η, η′, and π^{0} mesons) are quantum mechanical mixtures of the light quark states. The much larger mass differences between the charm and bottom quarks and the lighter quarks results in states that are well defined in terms of a quark–antiquark pair of a given flavor.

== Heavy quarks ==
Quarkonia, bound state of charmonium (cc̅) and bottomonium (bb̅) pairs, are crucial probes for studying the deconfined quark-gluon plasma created in ultra-relativistic heavy-ion collisions. The ψ and ϒ families provide direct evidence of the quark structure of hadrons, support the quark-gluon picture of perturbative quantum chromodynamics (QCD), and help determine the QCD scale parameter $\Lambda$. The dissociation temperature of quarkonium states depends on their binding energy, with strongly bound states like J/ψ and $\Upsilon(1S)$ melting at higher temperatures compared to loosely bound states such as $\psi(2S)$, $\chi_c$ for the charmonium family, and $\Upsilon(2S)$, $\Upsilon(3S)$ for bottomonia. This sequential dissociation process enables the use of quarkonium dissociation probabilities to estimate the medium temperature, assuming quarkonium dissociation is the primary mechanism involved.

Due to the high mass top quarks decay through the electroweak interaction before a bound state can form. However, near the pair production threshold, a pseudo-bound state emerges, leading to an enhancement that resembles a resonance peak. This pseudo-bound state is sometimes interpreted as toponium.

=== Charmonium ===
Charmonium

In the following table, the same particle can be named with the spectroscopic notation or with its mass. In some cases excitation series are used: ψ′ is the first excitation of ψ (which, for historical reasons, is called J/ψ particle); ψ″ is a second excitation, and so on. That is, names in the same cell are synonymous.

Some of the states are predicted, but have not been identified; others are unconfirmed. The quantum numbers of the X(3872) particle have been measured in 2013 by the LHCb experiment at CERN. This measurement shed some light on its identity, excluding the third option among the three envisioned, which are:

- a charmonium hybrid state
- a D^{0} D̅^{∗0} molecule
- a candidate for the 1^{1}D_{2} state

In 2005, the BaBar experiment announced the discovery of a new state: Y(4260). CLEO and Belle have since corroborated these observations. At first, Y(4260) was thought to be a charmonium state, but the evidence suggests more exotic explanations, such as a D "molecule", a 4-quark construct, or a hybrid meson.

Term symbol n^{2S+1}L_{J}	I^{G}(J^{PC})	Particle	mass [MeV/c^{2}]
1^{1}S_{0}	0^{+}(0^{−+})	η_{c}(1S)	2983.4±0.5
1^{3}S_{1}	0^{−}(1^{−−})	J/ψ(1S)	3096.900±0.006
1^{1}P_{1}	0^{−}(1^{+−})	h_{c}(1P)	3525.38±0.11
1^{3}P_{0}	0^{+}(0^{++})	χ_{c0}(1P)	3414.75±0.31
1^{3}P_{1}	0^{+}(1^{++})	χ_{c1}(1P)	3510.66±0.07
1^{3}P_{2}	0^{+}(2^{++})	χ_{c2}(1P)	3556.20±0.09
2^{1}S_{0}	0^{+}(0^{−+})	η_{c}(2S), or η′_{c}	3639.2±1.2
2^{3}S_{1}	0^{−}(1^{−−})	ψ(2S) or ψ(3686)	3686.097±0.025
1^{1}D_{2}	0^{+}(2^{−+})	η_{c2}(1D)	
1^{3}D_{1}	0^{−}(1^{−−})	ψ(3770)	3773.13±0.35
1^{3}D_{2}	0^{−}(2^{−−})	ψ_{2}(1D)	
1^{3}D_{3}	0^{−}(3^{−−})	ψ_{3}(1D)^{[‡]}	
2^{1}P_{1}	0^{−}(1^{+−})	h_{c}(2P)^{[‡]}	
2^{3}P_{0}	0^{+}(0^{++})	χ_{c0}(2P)^{[‡]}	
2^{3}P_{1}	0^{+}(1^{++})	χ_{c1}(2P)^{[‡]}	
2^{3}P_{2}	0^{+}(2^{++})	χ_{c2}(2P)^{[‡]}	
?^{?}?_{?}	0^{+}(1^{++})^{[}*^{]}	X(3872)	3871.69±0.17
?^{?}?_{?}	?^{?}(1^{−−})^{[†]}	Y(4260)	4263+8 −9

Notes:

[_{*}] Needs confirmation.
[†] Interpretation as a 1^{−−} charmonium state not favored.
[‡] Predicted, but not yet identified.

=== Bottomonium ===
Bottomonium

In the following table, the same particle can be named with the spectroscopic notation or with its mass. Some of the states are predicted, but have not been identified; others are unconfirmed.

Term symbol n^{2S+1}L_{J}	I^{G}(J^{PC})	Particle	mass [MeV/c^{2}]
1^{1}S_{0}	0^{+}(0^{−+})	η_{b}(1S)	9390.9±2.8
1^{3}S_{1}	0^{−}(1^{−−})	ϒ(1S)	9460.30±0.26
1^{1}P_{1}	0^{−}(1^{+−})	h_{b}(1P)	9899.3±0.8
1^{3}P_{0}	0^{+}(0^{++})	χ_{b0}(1P)	9859.44±0.52
1^{3}P_{1}	0^{+}(1^{++})	χ_{b1}(1P)	9892.76±0.40
1^{3}P_{2}	0^{+}(2^{++})	χ_{b2}(1P)	9912.21±0.40
2^{1}S_{0}	0^{+}(0^{−+})	η_{b}(2S)	
2^{3}S_{1}	0^{−}(1^{−−})	ϒ(2S)	10023.26±0.31
1^{1}D_{2}	0^{+}(2^{−+})	η_{b2}(1D)	
1^{3}D_{1}	0^{−}(1^{−−})	ϒ(1D)	
1^{3}D_{2}	0^{−}(2^{−−})	ϒ_{2}(1D)	10161.1±1.7
1^{3}D_{3}	0^{−}(3^{−−})	ϒ_{3}(1D)	
2^{1}P_{1}	0^{−}(1^{+−})	h_{b}(2P)	10259.8±1.2
2^{3}P_{0}	0^{+}(0^{++})	χ_{b0}(2P)	10232.5±0.6
2^{3}P_{1}	0^{+}(1^{++})	χ_{b1}(2P)	10255.46±0.55
2^{3}P_{2}	0^{+}(2^{++})	χ_{b2}(2P)	10268.65±0.55
3^{3}S_{1}	0^{−}(1^{−−})	ϒ(3S)	10355.2±0.5
3^{3}P_{1}	0^{+}(1^{++})	χ_{b1}(3P)	10513.42±0.41 (stat.) ± 0.53 (syst.)
3^{3}P_{2}	0^{+}(2^{++})	χ_{b2}(3P)	10524.02±0.57 (stat.) ± 0.53 (syst.)
4^{3}S_{1}	0^{−}(1^{−−})	ϒ(4S) or ϒ(10580)	10579.4±1.2
5^{3}S_{1}	0^{−}(1^{−−})	ϒ(5S) or ϒ(10860)	10865±8
6^{3}S_{1}	0^{−}(1^{−−})	ϒ(11020)	11019±8

Notes:

[_{*}] Preliminary results. Confirmation needed.

The ϒ(1S) state was discovered by the E288 experiment team, headed by Leon Lederman, at Fermilab in 1977, and was the first particle containing a bottom quark to be discovered. On 21 December 2011, the χ_{b2}(3P) state was the first particle discovered in the Large Hadron Collider; the discovery article was first posted on arXiv. In April 2012, Tevatron's DØ experiment confirmed the result in a paper published in Physical Review D. The J = 1 and J = 2 states were first resolved by the CMS experiment in 2018.

=== Toponium ===
Toponium

Toponium is a bound state of a top quark ($t$) and its antiparticle, the top antiquark ($\bar{t}$). While the standard gauge theory predicts the existence of the $t$-quark, to complete the third quark-lepton family, attempts to observe toponium $(t\bar{t})$ have been unsuccessful. The rapid decay of the top quark and the large spread in beam energy present significant experimental challenges. Despite this, searches continue through indirect methods, such as detecting specific decay products or anomalies indicating top quark pairs. Studying toponium decays offers a promising approach to search for Higgs particles with masses up to around 70 GeV, while similar searches in bottomonium decays could extend this range to 160 GeV. Additionally, studying gluon decay widths in light quarkonia can help determine the quantum chromodynamics (QCD) scale parameter.

In April 2025, analyzing a sample of 138 fb^{−1} of collisions from 2016 to 2018, the CMS experiment at LHC reported an excess of top-antitop pairs at the top-antitop production threshold with a statistical significance larger than 5 σ. The excess is compatible with a quasi-bound top-antitop pseudoscalar meson known as η_{t.}

== QCD and quarkonium ==
The computation of the properties of mesons in quantum chromodynamics (QCD) is a fully non-perturbative one. As a result, the only general method available is a direct computation using lattice QCD (LQCD) techniques. However, for heavy quarkonium, other techniques are also effective.

The light quarks in a meson move at relativistic speeds, since the mass of the bound state is much larger than the mass of the quark. However, the speed of the charm and the bottom quarks in their respective quarkonia is sufficiently small for relativistic effects in these states to be much reduced. It is estimated that the velocity, $\mathbf{v}$, is roughly 0.3 times the speed of light for charmonia and roughly 0.1 times the speed of light for bottomonia. The computation can then be approximated by an expansion in powers of $\mathbf{v}/c$ and $v^2/c^2$. This technique is called non-relativistic QCD (NRQCD).

NRQCD has also been quantized as a lattice gauge theory, which provides another technique for LQCD calculations to use. Good agreement with the bottomonium masses has been found, and this provides one of the best non-perturbative tests of LQCD. For charmonium masses the agreement is not as good, but the LQCD community is actively working on improving their techniques. Work is also being done on calculations of such properties as widths of quarkonia states and transition rates between the states.

An early, but still effective, technique uses models of the effective potential to calculate masses of quarkonium states. In this technique, one uses the fact that the motion of the quarks that comprise the quarkonium state is non-relativistic to assume that they move in a static potential, much like non-relativistic models of the hydrogen atom. One of the most popular potential models is the so-called Cornell (or funnel) potential:
$$V(r) = -\frac{a}{r} + b\,r,$$
where $r$ is the effective radius of the quarkonium state, $a$ and $b$ are parameters.

This potential has two parts. The first part, $a/r$, corresponds to the potential induced by one-gluon exchange between the quark and its anti-quark, and is known as the Coulombic part of the potential, since its $1/r$ form is identical to the well-known Coulombic potential induced by the electromagnetic force.

The second part, $b\,r$, is known as the confinement part of the potential, and parameterizes the poorly understood non-perturbative effects of QCD. Generally, when using this approach, a convenient form for the wave function of the quarks is taken, and then $a$ and $b$ are determined by fitting the results of the calculations to the masses of well-measured quarkonium states. Relativistic and other effects can be incorporated into this approach by adding extra terms to the potential, much as is done for the model hydrogen atom in non-relativistic quantum mechanics.

This form was derived from QCD up to $\mathcal{O}(\Lambda^3_\text{QCD}\,r^2)$ by Sumino (2003). It is popular because it allows for accurate predictions of quarkonium parameters without a lengthy lattice computation, and provides a separation between the short-distance Coulombic effects and the long-distance confinement effects that can be useful in understanding the quark / anti-quark force generated by QCD.

Quarkonia have been suggested as a diagnostic tool of the formation of the quark–gluon plasma: Both disappearance and enhancement of their formation depending on the yield of heavy quarks in plasma can occur.

== See also ==
- OZI rule
