= LHCb experiment =

Experiment at the Large Hadron Collider

Coordinates: 46°14′28″N 06°05′49″E

Large Hadron Collider (LHC)
- Plan of the LHC experiments and the preaccelerators

LHC experiments
- ATLAS: A Toroidal LHC Apparatus
- CMS: Compact Muon Solenoid
- LHCb: LHC-beauty
- ALICE: A Large Ion Collider Experiment
- TOTEM: Total Cross Section, Elastic Scattering and Diffraction Dissociation
- LHCf: LHC-forward
- MoEDAL: Monopole and Exotics Detector At the LHC
- FASER: ForwArd Search ExpeRiment
- SND: Scattering and Neutrino Detector

LHC preaccelerators
- p and Pb: Linear accelerators for protons (Linac 4) and lead (Linac 3)
- (not marked): Proton Synchrotron Booster
- PS: Proton Synchrotron
- SPS: Super Proton Synchrotron

The LHCb (Large Hadron Collider beauty) experiment is a particle physics detector collecting data at the Large Hadron Collider at CERN. LHCb specializes in the measurements of the parameters of CP violation in the interactions of b- and c-hadrons (heavy particles containing a beauty—also known as bottom—or charm quark, respectively). Such studies can help to explain the matter-antimatter asymmetry of the Universe. The detector is also able to perform measurements of production cross sections, exotic hadron spectroscopy, and electroweak physics in the forward region. The LHCb collaborators, who built, operate and analyse data from the experiment, are composed of approximately 1650 people from 98 scientific institutes, representing 22 countries. Tim Gershon is leading the collaboration for the period 2026 - 2029. The experiment is located at point 8 on the LHC tunnel close to Ferney-Voltaire, France just over the border from Geneva. The (small) MoEDAL experiment shares the same cavern.

== Physics goals ==
The experiment has wide physics program covering many important aspects of heavy flavour (both beauty and charm), electroweak and quantum chromodynamics (QCD) physics. Six key measurements have been identified involving B mesons. These are described in a roadmap document that formed the core physics programme for the first high-energy LHC running in 2010–2012. They include:

- Measuring the branching ratio of the rare B_{s} → μ^{+} μ^{−} decay.
- Measuring the forward-backward asymmetry of the muon pair in the flavour-changing neutral current B_{d} → K^{*} μ^{+} μ^{−} decay. Such a flavour changing neutral current cannot occur at tree-level in the Standard Model of Particle Physics, and only occurs through box and loop Feynman diagrams; properties of the decay can be strongly modified by new physics.
- Measuring the CP violating phase in the decay B_{s} → J/ψ φ, caused by interference between the decays with and without B_{s} oscillations. This phase is one of the CP observables with the smallest theoretical uncertainty in the Standard Model, and can be significantly modified by new physics.
- Measuring properties of radiative B decays, i.e. B meson decays with photons in the final states. Specifically, these are again flavour-changing neutral current decays.
- Tree-level determination of the unitarity triangle angle γ.
- Charmless charged two-body B decays.

== The LHCb detector ==
The fact that the two b-hadrons are predominantly produced in the same forward cone is exploited in the layout of the LHCb detector. The LHCb detector is a single arm forward spectrometer with a polar angular coverage from 10 to 300 milliradians (mrad) in the horizontal and 250 mrad in the vertical plane. The asymmetry between the horizontal and vertical plane is determined by a large dipole magnet with the main field component in the vertical direction.

The LHCb collaboration's logo

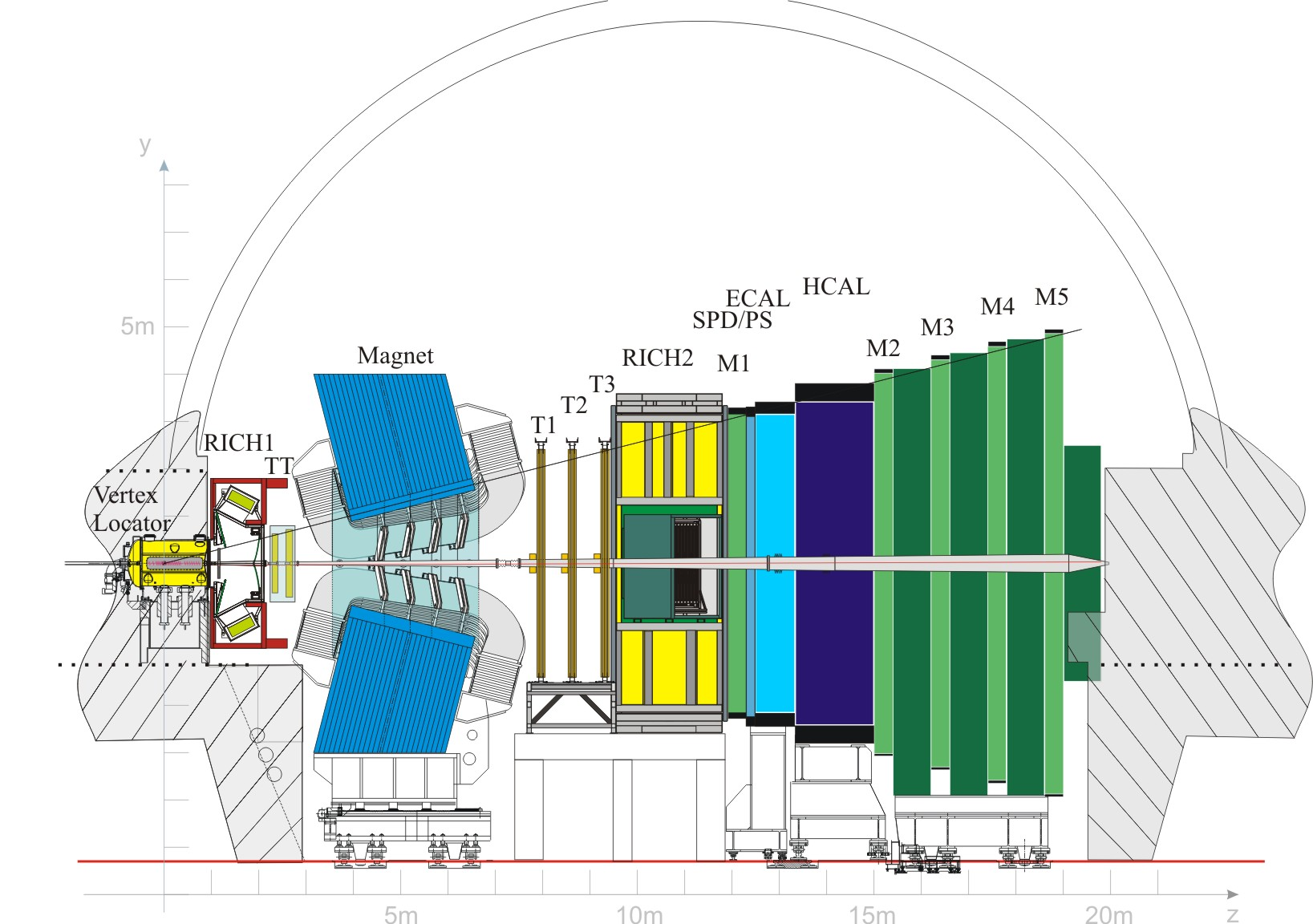

=== Subsystems ===
The Vertex Locator (VELO) is built around the proton interaction region. It is used to measure the particle trajectories close to the interaction point in order to precisely separate primary and secondary vertices.

The detector operates at 7 millimetres (0.28 in) from the LHC beam. This implies an enormous flux of particles; VELO has been designed to withstand integrated fluences of more than 10^{14} p/cm^{2} per year for a period of about three years. The detector operates in vacuum and is cooled to approximately −25 °C (−13 °F) using a biphase CO_{2} system. The data of the VELO detector are amplified and read out by the Beetle ASIC.

VELO
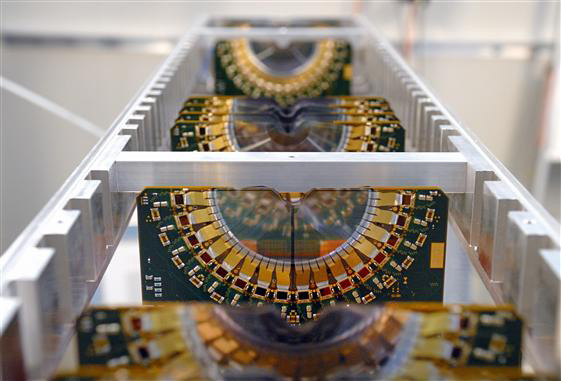
The vertex locator (VELO) during construction.

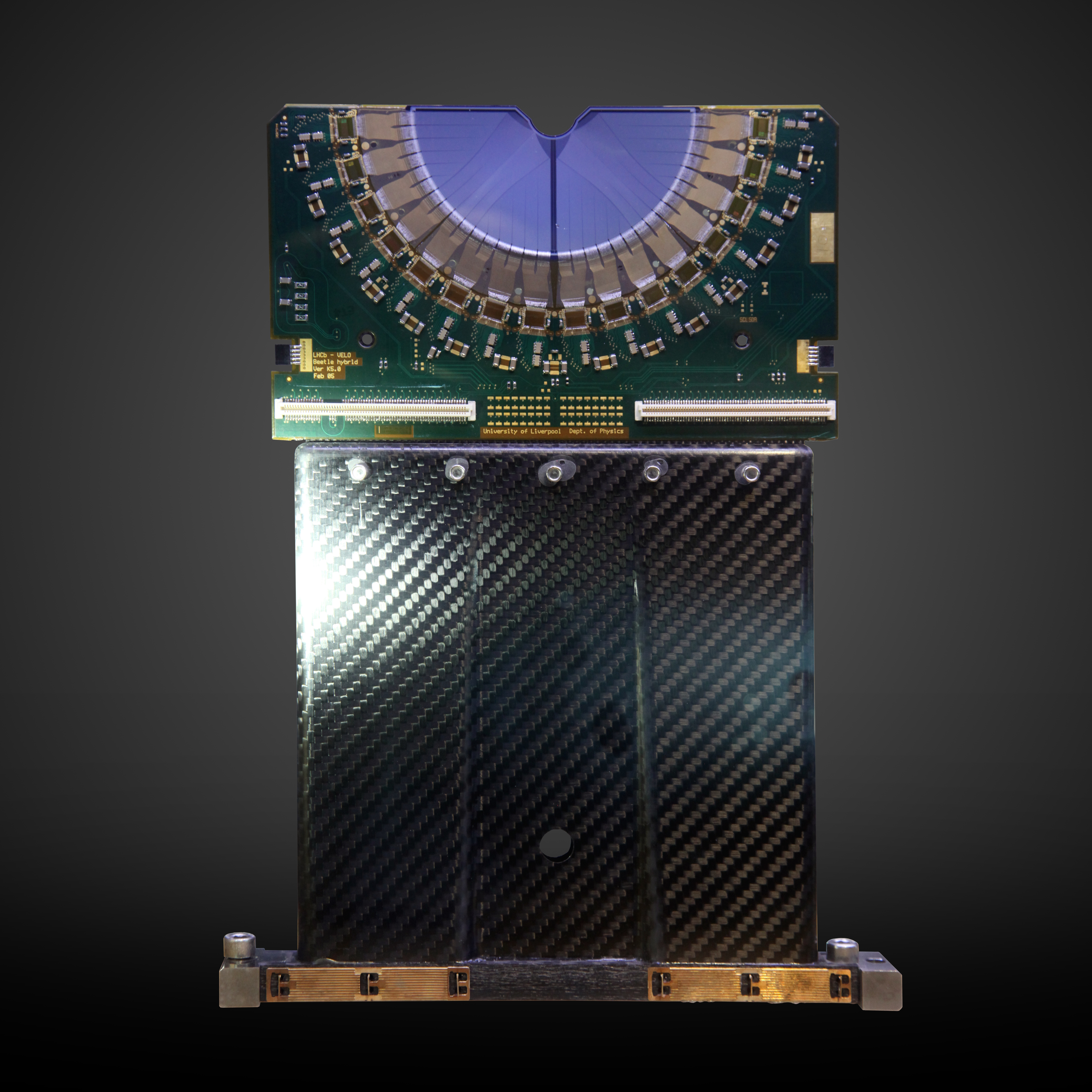
One element of VELO

The RICH-1 detector (Ring imaging Cherenkov detector) is located directly after the vertex detector. It is used for particle identification of low-momentum tracks.

The main tracking system is placed before and after the dipole magnet. It is used to reconstruct the trajectories of charged particles and to measure their momenta. The tracker consists of three subdetectors:

- The Tracker Turicensis, a silicon strip detector located before the LHCb dipole magnet
- The Outer Tracker. A straw-tube based detector located after the dipole magnet covering the outer part of the detector acceptance
- The Inner Tracker, silicon strip based detector located after the dipole magnet covering the inner part of the detector acceptance

Following the tracking system is RICH-2. It allows the identification of the particle type of high-momentum tracks.

The electromagnetic and hadronic calorimeters provide measurements of the energy of electrons, photons, and hadrons. These measurements are used at trigger level to identify the particles with large transverse momentum (high-Pt particles). The figure also shows SPD/PS components which were actually removed during upgrade 1 along with M1.

The muon system is used to identify and trigger on muons in the events.

=== LHCb upgrade (2019–2023) ===
At the end of 2018, the LHC was shut down for upgrades, and restarted in 2022. The full detector was completed in 2023. In the LHCb detector, almost all subdetectors were modernised or replaced to create the LHCb Upgrade. The new tracking system utilises a silicon pixel based vertex locator (VELO), silicon strip based upstream tracker (UT) and scintillator fibre tracker (SciFi). The RICH detectors were also updated. The readout electronics of the whole detector were replaced. The Upgrade system has higher granularity, higher radiation tolerance and facilitates fully software based triggering. The fully software trigger of the experiment means that every recorded collision is analysed by sophisticated software programmes without an intermediate hardware filtering step.

=== Leadership ===
The leader of the experiment is an elected position and is known as the spokesperson. The LHCb Collaboration is currently led by Spokesperson Tim Gershon

Former Spokespersons have been:

Vincenzo Vagnoni	(2023 – 2026)
Chris Parkes	(2020 – 2023)
Giovanni Passaleva	(2017 – 2020)
Guy Wilkinson	(2014 – 2017)
Pierluigi Campana	(2011 – 2014)
Andrei Golutvin	(2008 - 2011)
Tatsuya Nakada	(until 2008)

== Results ==
During the 2011 proton-proton run, LHCb recorded an integrated luminosity of 1 fb^{−1} at a collision energy of 7 TeV. In 2012, about 2 fb^{−1} was collected at an energy of 8 TeV. During 2015–2018 (Run 2 of the LHC), about 6 fb^{−1} was collected at a center-of-mass energy of 13 TeV. In addition, small samples were collected in proton-lead, lead-lead, and xenon-xenon collisions. The LHCb design also allowed the study of collisions of particle beams with a gas (helium or neon) injected inside the VELO volume, making it similar to a fixed-target experiment; this setup is usually referred to as "SMOG". These datasets allow the collaboration to carry out the physics programme of precision Standard Model tests with many additional measurements. As of 2021, LHCb has published more than 500 scientific papers.

=== Hadron spectroscopy ===
LHCb is designed to study beauty and charm hadrons. In addition to precision studies of the known particles such as mysterious X(3872), a number of new hadrons have been discovered by the experiment. As of 2021, all four LHC experiments have discovered about 60 new hadrons in total, vast majority of which by LHCb. In 2015, analysis of the decay of bottom lambda baryons (Λ^{0}_{b}) in the LHCb experiment revealed the apparent existence of pentaquarks, in what was described as an "accidental" discovery. Other notable discoveries are those of the "doubly charmed" baryon $\Xi_{\rm cc}^{++}$ in 2017, being a first known baryon with two heavy quarks; and of the fully-charmed tetraquark $\mathrm{T}_{\rm cccc}$ in 2020, made of two charm quarks and two charm antiquarks.

Hadrons discovered at LHCb. The term 'excited' for baryons and mesons means existence of a state of lower mass with the same quark content and isospin.
	Quark content (Note: Abbreviations are the first letter of the quark name (up='u', down='d', top='t', bottom='b', charmed='c', strange='s'). Antiquarks have overbars.)	Particle name	Type	Year of discovery
1	$\rm bud$	$\Lambda_{\rm b}(5912)^0$	Excited baryon	2012
2	$\rm bud$	$\Lambda_{\rm b}(5920)^0$	Excited baryon	2012
3	$\rm c\bar{u}$	$\rm D_J(2580)^0$	Excited meson	2013
4	$\rm c\bar{u}$	$\rm D_J(2740)^0$	Excited meson	2013
5	$\rm c\bar{d}$	$\rm D_J^*(2760)^+$	Excited meson	2013
6	$\rm c\bar{u}$	$\rm D_J(3000)^0$	Excited meson	2013
7	$\rm c\bar{u}$	$\rm D_J^*(3000)^0$	Excited meson	2013
8	$\rm c\bar{d}$	$\rm D_J^*(3000)^+$	Excited meson	2013
9	$\rm c\bar{s}$	$\rm D_{s1}^*(2860)^+$	Excited meson	2014
10	$\rm bsd$	$\Xi^{'-}_{\rm b}$	Excited baryon	2014
11	$\rm bsd$	$\Xi^{*-}_{\rm b}$	Excited baryon	2014
12	$\rm \bar{b}u$	$\rm B_J(5840)^+$	Excited meson	2015
13	$\rm \bar{b}d$	$\rm B_J(5840)^0$	Excited meson	2015
14	$\rm \bar{b}u$	$\rm B_J(5970)^+$	Excited meson	2015
15	$\rm \bar{b}d$	$\rm B_J(5970)^+$	Excited meson	2015
16 (Note: Previously unknown combination of quarks)	$\rm c\bar{c}uud$	$\rm P_c(4380)^+$	Pentaquark	2015
17	$\rm c\bar{c}s\bar{s}$	$\rm X(4274)$	Tetraquark	2016
18	$\rm c\bar{c}s\bar{s}$	$\rm X(4500)$	Tetraquark	2016
19	$\rm c\bar{c}s\bar{s}$	$\rm X(4700)$	Tetraquark	2016
20	$\rm c\bar{u}$	$\rm D_3^*(2760)^0$	Excited meson	2016
21	$\rm cud$	$\Lambda_{\rm c}(2860)^+$	Excited baryon	2017
22	$\rm css$	$\Omega_{\rm c}(3000)^0$	Excited baryon	2017
23	$\rm css$	$\Omega_{\rm c}(3050)^0$	Excited baryon	2017
24	$\rm css$	$\Omega_{\rm c}(3066)^0$	Excited baryon	2017
25	$\rm css$	$\Omega_{\rm c}(3090)^0$	Excited baryon	2017
26	$\rm css$	$\Omega_{\rm c}(3119)^0$	Excited baryon	2017
27 (Note: Previously unknown combination of quarks; first baryon with two charm quarks, and the only weakly-decaying particle discovered so far at the LHC.)	$\rm ccu$	$\Xi_{\rm cc}^{++}$	Baryon	2017
28	$\rm bsd$	$\Xi_{\rm b}(6227)^-$	Excited baryon	2018
29	$\rm buu$	$\Sigma_{\rm b}(6097)^+$	Excited baryon	2018
30	$\rm bdd$	$\Sigma_{\rm b}(6097)^-$	Excited baryon	2018
31	$\rm c\bar{c}$	$\psi_3 (3842)$	Excited meson	2019
32	$\rm c\bar{c}uud$	$\rm P_c(4312)^+$	Pentaquark	2019
33	$\rm c\bar{c}uud$	$\rm P_c(4440)^+$	Pentaquark	2019
34	$\rm c\bar{c}uud$	$\rm P_c(4457)^+$	Pentaquark	2019
35	$\rm bud$	$\Lambda_{\rm b}(6146)^0$	Excited baryon	2019
36	$\rm bud$	$\Lambda_{\rm b}(6152)^0$	Excited baryon	2019
37	$\rm bss$	$\Omega_{\rm b}(6340)^-$	Excited baryon	2020
38	$\rm bss$	$\Omega_{\rm b}(6350)^-$	Excited baryon	2020
39 (Note: Simultaneous with CMS; CMS had not enough data to claim the discovery.)	$\rm bud$	$\Lambda_{\rm b}(6070)^0$	Excited baryon	2020
40	$\rm csd$	$\Xi_{\rm c}(2923)^0$	Excited baryon	2020
41	$\rm csd$	$\Xi_{\rm c}(2939)^0$	Excited baryon	2020
42 (Note: Previously unknown combination of quarks; first tetraquark made exclusively of charm quarks)	$\rm cc\bar{c}\bar{c}$	$\rm T_{cccc}$	Tetraquark	2020
43 (Note: Previously unknown combination of quarks; first tetraquark with all quarks being different)	$\rm \bar{c}d\bar{s}u$	$\rm X_0(2900)$	Tetraquark	2020
44	$\rm \bar{c}d\bar{s}u$	$\rm X_1(2900)$	Tetraquark	2020
45	$\rm bsu$	$\Xi_{\rm b}(6227)^0$	Excited baryon	2020
46	$\rm \bar{b}s$	$\rm B_s(6063)^0$	Excited meson	2020
47	$\rm \bar{b}s$	$\rm B_s(6114)^0$	Excited meson	2020
48	$\rm c\bar{s}$	$\rm D_{s0}(2590)^+$	Excited meson	2020
49	$\rm c\bar{c}s\bar{s}$	$\rm X(4630)$	Tetraquark	2021
50	$\rm c\bar{c}s\bar{s}$	$\rm X(4685)$	Tetraquark	2021
51	$\rm c\bar{c}u\bar{s}$	$\rm Z_{cs}(4000)^+$	Tetraquark	2021
52	$\rm c\bar{c}u\bar{s}$	$\rm Z_{cs}(4220)^+$	Tetraquark	2021

=== CP violation and mixing ===
Studies of charge-parity (CP) violation in B-meson decays is the primary design goal of the LHCb experiment. As of 2021, LHCb measurements confirm with a remarkable precision the picture described by the CKM unitarity triangle. The angle $\gamma \, \,(\alpha_3)$ of the unitarity triangle is now known to about 4°, and is in agreement with indirect determinations.

In 2019, LHCb announced discovery of CP violation in decays of charm mesons. This is the first time CP violation is seen in decays of particles other than kaons or B mesons. The rate of the observed CP asymmetry is at the upper edge of existing theoretical predictions, which triggered some interest among particle theorists regarding possible impact of physics beyond the Standard Model.

In 2020, LHCb announced discovery of time-dependent CP violation in decays of B_{s} mesons. The oscillation frequency of B_{s} mesons to its antiparticle and vice versa was measured to a great precision in 2021.

=== Rare decays ===
Rare decays are the decay modes harshly suppressed in the Standard Model, which makes them sensitive to potential effects from yet unknown physics mechanisms.

In 2014, LHCb and CMS experiments published a joint paper in Nature announcing the discovery of the very rare decay $\mathrm{B}^0_{\rm s} \to \mu^+\mu^-$, rate of which was found close to the Standard Model predictions. This measurement has harshly limited the possible parameter space of supersymmetry theories, which have predicted a large enhancement in rate. Since then, LHCb has published several papers with more precise measurements in this decay mode.

Anomalies were found in several rare decays of B mesons. The most famous example in the so-called $\mathrm{P}_5^'$ angular observable was found in the decay $\mathrm{B}^0 \to \mathrm{K}^{*0} \mu^+\mu^-$, where the deviation between the data and theoretical prediction has persisted for years. The decay rates of several rare decays also differ from the theoretical predictions, though the latter have sizeable uncertainties.

=== Lepton flavour universality ===
In the Standard Model, couplings of charged leptons (electron, muon and tau lepton) to the gauge bosons are expected to be identical, with the only difference emerging from the lepton masses. This postulate is referred to as "lepton flavour universality". As a consequence, in decays of b hadrons, electrons and muons should be produced at similar rates, and the small difference due to the lepton masses is precisely calculable.

LHCb has found deviations from this predictions by comparing the rate of the decay $\mathrm{B}^+ \to \mathrm{K}^+ \mu^+ \mu^-$ to that of $\mathrm{B}^+ \to \mathrm{K}^+ \mathrm{e}^+ \mathrm{e}^-$, and in similar processes. However, as the decays in question are very rare, a larger dataset needs to be analysed in order to make definitive conclusions.

In March 2021, LHCb announced that the anomaly in lepton universality crossed the "3 sigma" statistical significance threshold, which translates to a p-value of 0.1%. The measured value of $R_{\rm K} = \frac{\mathcal{B}(\mathrm{B}^+ \to \mathrm{K}^+ \mu^+\mu^-)}{\mathcal{B}(\mathrm{B}^+ \to \mathrm{K}^+ \mathrm{e}^+\mathrm{e}^-)}$, where symbol $\mathcal{B}$ denotes probability of a given decay to happen, was found to be $0.846^{+0.044}_{-0.041}$ while the Standard Model predicts it to be very close to unity. In December 2022 improved measurements discarded this anomaly.

In August 2023 joined searches in leptonic decays $b\rightarrow s\ell^+\ell^-$ by the LHCb and semileptonic decays $b\rightarrow s\ell\nu$ by Belle II (with $\ell=e,\mu$) set new limits for universality violations.

=== Other measurements ===
LHCb has contributed to studies of quantum chromodynamics, electroweak physics, and provided cross-section measurements for astroparticle physics.

== See also ==
- B-factory
- Belle II experiment
