= BES III =

Particle physics experiment in Beijing

The Beijing Spectrometer III (BES III) is a particle physics experiment at the Beijing Electron–Positron Collider II (BEPC II) at the Institute of High Energy Physics (IHEP). It is designed to study the physics of charm, charmonium, and light hadron decays. It also performs studies of the tau lepton, tests of QCD, and searches for physics beyond the Standard Model. The experiment started collecting data in the summer of 2008.

== Beam ==
BES III receives electron–positron collisions from BEPC II: a circular collider with a circumference of 240 m. BEPC II maintains a variable collision energy between 2 and 4.63 GeV, with a luminosity of 10^{33} cm^{−2}·s^{−1}. Each of the beams contains 93 electron or positron bunches of length 1.5 cm and a total current of 0.91 A.

== Detector ==
The BES III detector is a cylindrically symmetric 6-meter long and 7-meter diameter detector surrounding the interaction point of 2 beam pipe rings. It has 4 major detector layers: a main drift chamber (MDC), time-of-flight counter (TOF), cesium-iodide electromagnetic calorimeter (CsI EMC), and a muon counter (Muon Chamber, MC, μC). The inner three layers are inside of a 1-tesla superconducting solenoid magnet.

The main drift chamber (MDC) is the first inner detector layer around the beam pipe and collision point. The MDC's main purpose is to measure the momentum and energy loss per unit distance (dE/dx) from charged particles. The chamber is 2.4 meters long and contains 6796 gold coated 25-micron tungsten signal wires that are arranged in 44 cylindrical layers. The half width of the inner 8 layers is 6 mm and the half width of the outer layers are 8.1 mm. Between the wires, a mixture of Helium and Propane gas are mixed together at a ratio of 60/40, designed to minimize multiple scattering and maintain a high dE/dx. Aluminum 110-micron wires are strung across the chamber for field shaping. As a charged particle passes through the chamber the gas becomes ionized along the path of the particle and the ions drift to the nearest wires. The particles path will be curved because of the magnetic field the solenoid creates. The amount of curvature allows for the momentum of the particle to be calculated.

The TOF, the second inner detector, makes time measurements that are used to assist in particle identification and as a fast trigger to reject cosmic rays. The detector is made out of two cylindrical layers of 88 2.4-meters long plastic scintillating bars. There is a photo-multiplying tube (PMT) at each end of the bars. The two PMTs are averaged and the travel time of the photons are removed. The electromagnetic calorimeter's main purpose is to make energy and position measurements using Caesium Iodide scintillating crystals. The geometry of the crystals is 44 rings of 120 crystals along the axis of the cylinder with a 1.5 degree tilt. Two endcaps covering the end of the cylinder allow a total coverage of 93% of the space. Photo detectors are placed at the ends of each crystal. Photon and electron energies can be measured in the range of 20 MeV to 4.6 GeV. The muon identifier (MI) is composed of nine layers of Iron absorbers and resistive plate counters (RPC). RPC are composed of two separated Bakelite plastic plates with gas between them and enclosed in an Aluminium box. Having MI enables discrimination between muons and kaons.

A crucial component of the detector is the trigger system that selects the useful collision data to save for analysis. Before the trigger, there are 40 million background events per second detected, which is reduced to around 4 thousand interesting collisions per second. The trigger is hardware based, and its design is predetermined by Monte Carlo simulations.
