= Muon spin spectroscopy =

Experimental technique in physics

Muon Spin Resonance basic principle (Musr)

Muon spin spectroscopy, also known as μSR, is an experimental technique based on the implantation of spin-polarized muons in matter and on the detection of the influence of the atomic, molecular or crystalline surroundings on their spin motion. The motion of the muon spin is due to the magnetic field experienced by the particle and may provide information on its local environment in a very similar way to other magnetic resonance (Note: Resonance techniques are often characterized by the use of resonant circuits, which is not the case for muon spin spectroscopy. However the true resonant nature of all these techniques, muon spectroscopy included, lies in the very narrow, resonant requirement upon any time dependent perturbation in order for it to effectively influence the probe's dynamics: for every excitation interacting with the muon (lattice vibrations, charge and electronic spin waves) only those spectral components very closely matching the muon precession frequency in the specific experimental condition can cause a significant muon spin motion.) techniques, such as electron spin resonance (ESR or EPR) and, more closely, nuclear magnetic resonance (NMR).

== Introduction ==
Muon spin spectroscopy is an atomic, molecular and condensed matter experimental technique that exploits nuclear detection methods. In analogy with the acronyms for the previously established spectroscopies NMR and ESR, muon spin spectroscopy is also known as μSR. The acronym stands for muon spin rotation, relaxation, or resonance, depending respectively on whether the muon spin motion is predominantly a rotation (more precisely a precession around a still magnetic field), a relaxation towards an equilibrium direction, or a more complex dynamic dictated by the addition of short radio frequency pulses. μSR does not require any radio-frequency technique to align the probing spin.

More generally speaking, muon spin spectroscopy includes any study of the interactions of the muon's magnetic moment with its surroundings when implanted into any kind of matter. Its two most notable features are its ability to study local environments, due to the short effective range of muon interactions with matter, and the characteristic time-window (10^{−13} – 10^{−5} s) of the dynamical processes in atomic, molecular and condensed media. The closest parallel to μSR is "pulsed NMR", in which one observes time-dependent transverse nuclear polarization or the so-called "free induction decay" of the nuclear polarization. However, a key difference is that in μSR one uses a specifically implanted spin (the muon's) and does not rely on internal nuclear spins.

Although particles are used as a probe, μSR is not a diffraction technique. A clear distinction between the μSR technique and those involving neutrons or X-rays is that scattering is not involved. Neutron diffraction techniques, for example, use the change in energy and/or momentum of a scattered neutron to deduce the sample properties. In contrast, the implanted muons are not diffracted but remain in a sample until they decay. Only a careful analysis of the decay product (i.e. a positron) provides information about the interaction between the implanted muon and its environment in the sample.

As with many of the other nuclear methods, μSR relies on discoveries and developments made in the field of particle physics. Following the discovery of the muon by Seth Neddermeyer and Carl D. Anderson in 1936, pioneer experiments on its properties were performed with cosmic rays. Indeed, with one muon hitting each square centimeter of the earth's surface every minute, the muons constitute the foremost constituent of cosmic rays arriving at ground level. However, μSR experiments require muon fluxes of the order of $10^4-10^7$ muons per second per square centimeter. Such fluxes can only be obtained in high-energy particle accelerators which have been developed during the last 50 years.

== Muon production ==
The collision of an accelerated proton beam (typical energy 600 MeV) with the nuclei of a production target produces positive pions ($\pi^+$) via the possible reactions:

$$\begin{array}{lll}
p + p & \rightarrow & p + n + \pi^+\\
p + n & \rightarrow & n + n + \pi^+\\
\end{array}$$

From the subsequent weak decay of the pions (MEAN lifetime $\tau_{\pi^+}$ = 26.03 ns) positive muons ($\mu^+$) are formed via the two body decay:

$$\pi^+ \rightarrow \mu^+ + \nu_{\mu} .$$

Parity violation in the weak interactions implies that only left-handed neutrinos exist, with their spin antiparallel to their linear momentum (likewise only right-handed anti-neutrino are found in nature). Since the pion is spinless both the neutrino and the $\mu^+$ are ejected with spin antiparallel to their momentum in the pion rest frame. This is the key to provide spin-polarised muon beams. According to the value of the pion momentum different types of $\mu^+$-beams are available for μSR measurements.

=== Energy classes of muon beams ===
Muon beams are classified into three types based on the energy of the muons being produced: high-energy, surface or "Arizona", and ultra-slow muon beams.

High-energy muon beams are formed by the pions escaping the production target at high energies. They are collected over a certain solid angle by quadrupole magnets and directed onto a decay section consisting of a long superconducting solenoid with a field of several tesla. If the pion momentum is not too high, a large fraction of the pions will have decayed before they reach the end of the solenoid. In the laboratory frame the polarization of a high-energy muon beam is limited to about 80% and its energy is of the order of ~40-50MeV. Although such a high energy beam requires the use of suitable moderators and samples with sufficient thickness, it guarantees a homogeneous implantation of the muons in the sample volume. Such beams are also used to study specimens inside of recipients, e.g. samples inside pressure cells. Such muon beams are available at PSI, TRIUMF, J-PARC and RIKEN-RAL.

The second type of muon beam is often called the surface or Arizona beam (recalling the pioneering work of Pifer et al. from the University of Arizona). In these beams, muons arise from pions decaying at rest inside but near the surface of the production target. Such muons are 100% polarized, ideally monochromatic, and have a very low momentum of 29.8 MeV/c (corresponding to a kinetic energy of 4.1 MeV). They have a range width in matter of the order of 180 mg/cm^{2}. The paramount advantage of this type of beam is the ability to use relatively thin samples. Beams of this type are available at PSI (Swiss Muon Source SμS), TRIUMF, J-PARC, ISIS Neutron and Muon Source and RIKEN-RAL.

Positive muon beams of even lower energy (ultra-slow muons with energy down to the eV-keV range) can be obtained by further reducing the energy of an Arizona beam by utilizing the energy-loss characteristics of large band gap solid moderators. This technique was pioneered by researchers at the TRIUMF cyclotron facility in Vancouver, B.C., Canada. It was christened with the acronym μSOL (muon separator on-line) and initially employed LiF as the moderating solid. The same 1986 paper also reported the observation of negative muonium ions (i.e., Mu^{−} or μ^{+} e^{−} e^{−}) in vacuum. In 1987, the slow μ^{+} production rate was increased 100-fold using thin-film rare-gas solid moderators, producing a usable flux of low-energy positive muons. This production technique was subsequently adopted by PSI for their low-energy positive muon beam facility. The tunable energy range of such muon beams corresponds to implantation depths in solids of less than a nanometer up to several hundred nanometers. Therefore, the study of magnetic properties as a function of the distance from the surface of the sample is possible. At the present time, PSI is the only facility where such a low-energy muon beam is available on a regular basis. Technical developments have been also conducted at RIKEN-RAL, but with a strongly reduced low-energy muon rate. J-PARC is projecting the development of a high-intensity low-energy muon beam.

=== Continuous vs. pulsed muon beams ===
In addition to the above-mentioned classification based on energy, muon beams are also divided according to the time structure of the particle accelerator, i.e. continuous or pulsed.

For continuous muon sources no dominating time structure is present. By selecting an appropriate incoming muon rate, muons are implanted into the sample one-by-one. The main advantage is that the time resolution is solely determined by the detector construction and the read-out electronics. There are two main limitations for this type of source, however: (i) unrejected charged particles accidentally hitting the detectors produce non-negligible random background counts; this compromises measurements after a few muon lifetimes, when the random background exceeds the true decay events; and (ii) the requirement to detect muons one at a time sets a maximum event rate. The background problem can be reduced by the use of electrostatic deflectors to ensure that no muons enter the sample before the decay of the previous muon. PSI and TRIUMF host the two continuous muon sources available for μSR experiments.

At pulsed muon sources protons hitting the production target are bunched into short, intense, and widely separated pulses that provide a similar time structure in the secondary muon beam. An advantage of pulsed muon sources is that the event rate is only limited by detector construction. Furthermore, detectors are active only after the incoming muon pulse, strongly reducing the accidental background counts. The virtual absence of background allows the extension of the time window for measurements up to about ten times the muon mean lifetime. The principal downside is that the width of the muon pulse limits the time resolution. ISIS Neutron and Muon Source and J-PARC are the two pulsed muon sources available for μSR experiments.

== Spectroscopic technique ==
=== Muon implantation ===
The muons are implanted into the sample of interest where they lose energy very quickly. Fortunately, this deceleration process occurs in such a way that it does not jeopardize a μSR measurement. On one side it is very fast (much faster than 100 ps), which is much shorter than a typical μSR time window (up to 20 μs), and on the other side, all the processes involved during the deceleration are Coulombic (ionization of atoms, electron scattering, electron capture) in origin and do not interact with the muon spin, so that the muon is thermalized without any significant loss of polarization.

The positive muons usually adopt interstitial sites of the crystallographic lattice, markedly distinguished by their electronic (charge) state. The spectroscopy of a muon chemically bound to an unpaired electron is remarkably different from that of all other muon states, which motivates the historical distinction in paramagnetic and diamagnetic states. Note that many diamagnetic muon states really behave like paramagnetic centers, according to the standard definition of a paramagnet. For example, in most metallic samples, which are Pauli paramagnets, the muon's positive charge is collectively screened by a cloud of conduction electrons. Thus, in metals, the muon is not bound to a single electron, hence it is in the so-called diamagnetic state and behaves like a free muon. In insulators or semiconductors a collective screening cannot take place and the muon will usually pick up one electron and form a so-called muonium (Mu=μ^{+}+e^{−}), which has similar size (Bohr radius), reduced mass, and ionization energy to the hydrogen atom. This is the prototype of the so-called paramagnetic state.

=== Detection of muon polarization ===
The decay of the positive muon into a positron and two neutrinos occurs via the weak interaction process after a mean lifetime of τ_{μ} = 2.197034(21) μs:

$$\mu^+ \rightarrow e^+ + \nu_e + \bar{\nu}_{\mu}~.$$

Parity violation in the weak interaction leads in this more complicated case (three body decay) to an anisotropic distribution of the positron emission with respect to the spin direction of the μ^{+} at the decay time. The positron emission probability is given by

$$W(\theta)d\theta \propto (1 + a\cos\theta)d\theta~,$$

where $\theta$ is the angle between the positron trajectory and the μ^{+}-spin, and $a$ is an intrinsic asymmetry parameter determined by the weak decay mechanism. This anisotropic emission constitutes in fact the basics for the μSR technique.

The average asymmetry $A$ is measured over a statistical ensemble of implanted muons and it depends on further experimental parameters, such as the beam spin polarization $P_{\mu}$, close to one, as already mentioned. Theoretically $A$ =1/3 is obtained if all emitted positrons are detected with the same efficiency, irrespective of their energy. Practically, values of $A$ ≈ 0.25 are routinely obtained.

The muon spin motion may be measured over a time scale dictated by the muon decay, i.e. a few times τ_{μ}, roughly 10 μs. The asymmetry in the muon decay correlates the positron emission and the muon spin directions. The simplest example is when the spin direction of all muons remains constant in time after implantation (no motion). In this case the asymmetry shows up as an imbalance between the positron counts in two equivalent detectors placed in front and behind the sample, along the beam axis. Each of them records an exponentially decaying rate as a function of the time t elapsed from implantation, according to

$$N_\alpha(t)=N_0 \exp(-t/\tau_\mu) (1+\alpha A)$$

with $\alpha=\pm 1$ for the detector looking towards and away from the spin arrow, respectively. Considering that the huge muon spin polarization is completely outside thermal equilibrium, a dynamical relaxation towards the equilibrium unpolarized state typically shows up in the count rate, as an additional decay factor in front of the experimental asymmetry parameter, A. A magnetic field parallel to the initial muon spin direction probes the dynamical relaxation rate as a function of the additional muon Zeeman energy, without introducing additional coherent spin dynamics. This experimental arrangement is called Longitudinal Field (LF) μSR.

A special case of LF μSR is Zero Field (ZF) μSR, when the external magnetic field is zero. This experimental condition is particularly important since it allows to probe any internal quasi-static (i.e. static on the muon time-scale) magnetic field of field distribution at the muon site. Internal quasi-static fields may appear spontaneously, not induced by the magnetic response of the sample to an external field They are produced by disordered nuclear magnetic moments or, more importantly, by ordered electron magnetic moments and orbital currents.

Another simple type of μSR experiment is when implanted all muon spins precess coherently around the external magnetic field of modulus $B$, perpendicular to the beam axis, causing the count unbalance to oscillate at the corresponding Larmor frequency $\omega$ between the same two detectors, according to

$$N_\alpha(t)=N_0 \exp(-t/\tau_\mu) (1+\alpha A\cos\omega t)$$

Since the Larmor frequency is $\omega=\gamma_\mu B$, with a gyromagnetic ratio $\gamma_\mu=851.616$ Mrad(sT)^{−1}, the frequency spectrum obtained by means of this experimental arrangement provides a direct measure of the internal magnetic field intensity distribution. The distribution produces an additional decay factor of the experimental asymmetry A. This method is usually referred to as Transverse Field (TF) μSR.

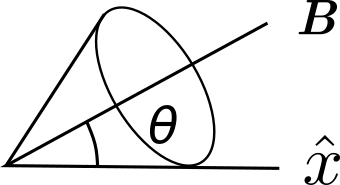
The figure shows the precession cone of the muon spin around the external magnetic field, that forms an angle $\theta$ with the initial muon spin direction $\hat x$, which coincides with the axis of the two detectors.

A more general case is when the initial muon spin direction (coinciding with the detector axis) forms an angle $\theta$ with the field direction. In this case the muon spin precession describes a cone which results in both a longitudinal component, $A\cos^2\theta$, and a transverse precessing component, $A\sin^2\theta\cos\omega t$, of the total asymmetry. ZF μSR experiments in the presence of a spontaneous internal field fall into this category as well.

== Applications ==
Muon spin rotation and relaxation are mostly performed with positive muons. They are well suited to the study of magnetic fields at the atomic scale inside matter, such as those produced by various kinds of magnetism and/or superconductivity encountered in compounds occurring in nature or artificially produced by modern material science.

The London penetration depth is one of the most important parameters characterizing a superconductor because its inverse square provides a measure of the density n_{s} of Cooper pairs. The dependence of n_{s} on temperature and magnetic field directly indicates the symmetry of the superconducting gap. Muon spin spectroscopy provides a way to measure the penetration depth, and so has been used to study high-temperature cuprate superconductors since their discovery in 1986.

Other important fields of application of μSR exploit the fact that positive muons capture electrons to form muonium atoms which behave chemically as light isotopes of the hydrogen atom. This allows investigation of the largest known kinetic isotope effect in some of the simplest types of chemical reactions, as well as the early stages of formation of radicals in organic chemicals. Muonium is also studied as an analogue of hydrogen in semiconductors, where hydrogen is one of the most ubiquitous impurities.

== Facilities ==
μSR requires a particle accelerator for the production of a muon beam. This is presently achieved at few large scale facilities in the world: the CMMS continuous source at TRIUMF in Vancouver, Canada; the SμS continuous source at the Paul Scherrer Institut (PSI) in Villigen, Switzerland; the ISIS Neutron and Muon Source and RIKEN-RAL pulsed sources at the Rutherford Appleton Laboratory in Chilton, United Kingdom; and the J-PARC facility in Tokai, Japan, where a new pulsed source is being built to replace that at KEK in Tsukuba, Japan. Muon beams are also available at the Laboratory of Nuclear Problems, Joint Institute for Nuclear Research (JINR) in Dubna, Russia. The International Society for μSR Spectroscopy (ISMS) exists to promote the worldwide advancement of μSR. Membership in the society is open free of charge to all individuals in academia, government laboratories and industry who have an interest in the society's goals.

== See also ==
- Muon
- Muonium
- Nuclear magnetic resonance
- Perturbed angular correlation
