= Charge radius =

Measure of the size of atomic nuclei

The charge radius of an atomic nucleus tells its size. The nucleus (center) of an atom is incredibly tiny. A nucleus, as with an atom, is actually a hazy quantum-mechanical wave-cloud, because each of the particles inside it are also hazy wave-clouds. Not having a definite surface, the cutoff is usually statistical, and can be calculated in a variety of ways.

Name	typical or avg size	refs
atomic nucleus	0.003 pm	
atom	100 pm	
light wavelength	550 000 pm	
human cell nucleus	6 000 000 pm	
human HeLa cell	16 000 000 pm	
one inch	25 400 000 000 pm	

The rms charge radius is a measure of the size of an atomic nucleus, particularly the proton distribution. The proton radius can be measured by the scattering of electrons by the nucleus. Relative changes in the mean squared nuclear charge distribution can be precisely measured with atomic spectroscopy.

== Definition ==
The problem of defining a radius for the atomic nucleus has some similarity to that of defining a radius for the entire atom; neither has well-defined boundaries. However, basic liquid drop models of the nucleus imagine a fairly uniform density of nucleons, theoretically giving a more recognizable surface to a nucleus than an atom, the latter being composed of highly diffuse electron clouds with density gradually reducing away from the centre. For individual protons and neutrons or small nuclei, the concepts of size and boundary can be less clear. A single nucleon needs to be regarded as a "color confined" bag of three valence quarks, binding gluons, and a so-called "sea" of quark–antiquark pairs. Also, the nucleon is surrounded by its Yukawa pion field responsible for the strong nuclear force. It could be difficult to decide whether to include the surrounding Yukawa meson field as part of the proton or nucleon size or to regard it as a separate entity.

Fundamentally important are realizable experimental procedures to measure some aspect of size, whatever that may mean in the quantum realm of atoms and nuclei. Foremost, the nucleus can be modeled as a sphere of positive charge for the interpretation of electron scattering experiments: the electrons "see" a range of cross-sections, for which a mean can be taken. The qualification of "rms" (root mean square) arises because it is the nuclear cross-section, proportional to the square of the radius, which is determining for electron scattering.

This definition of charge radius is often applied to composite hadrons such as a proton, neutron, pion, or kaon, that are made up of more than one quark. In the case of an anti-matter baryon (e.g. an anti-proton), and some particles with zero net electric charge, the composite particle must be modeled as a sphere of negative rather than positive electric charge for the interpretation of electron scattering experiments. In these cases, the square of the charge radius of the particle is defined to be negative, with the same absolute value with units of length squared equal to the positive squared charge radius that it would have had if it was identical in all other respects but each quark in the particle had the opposite electric charge (with the charge radius itself having a value that is an imaginary number with units of length). It is customary when charge radius takes an imaginary numbered value to report the negative valued square of the charge radius, rather than the charge radius itself, for a particle.

The best known particle with a negative squared charge radius is the neutron. The heuristic explanation for why the squared charge radius of a neutron is negative, despite its overall neutral electric charge, is that this is the case because its negatively charged down quarks are, on average, located in the outer part of the neutron, while its positively charged up quark is, on average, located towards the center of the neutron. This asymmetric distribution of charge within the particle gives rise to a small negative squared charge radius for the particle as a whole. But, this is only the simplest of a variety of theoretical models, some of which are more elaborate, that are used to explain this property of a neutron.

For deuterons and higher nuclei, it is conventional to distinguish between the scattering charge radius, r_{d} (obtained from scattering data), and the bound-state charge radius, R_{d}, which includes the Darwin–Foldy term to account for the behaviour of the anomalous magnetic moment in an electromagnetic field and which is appropriate for treating spectroscopic data. The two radii are related by

$$R_{\rm d} = \sqrt{r_{\rm d}^2 + \frac{3}{4}\left(\frac{m_{\rm e}}{m_{\rm d}}\right)^2 \left(\frac{\lambda_{\rm C}}{2\pi}\right)^2},$$

where m_{e} and m_{d} are the masses of the electron and the deuteron respectively while λ_{C} is the Compton wavelength of the electron. For the proton, the two radii are the same.

== History ==
The first estimate of a nuclear charge radius was made by Hans Geiger and Ernest Marsden in 1909, under the direction of Ernest Rutherford at the Physical Laboratories of the University of Manchester, UK. The famous experiment involved the scattering of α-particles by gold foil, with some of the particles being scattered through angles of more than 90°, that is coming back to the same side of the foil as the α-source. Rutherford put an upper limit on the radius of the gold nucleus of 34 femtometres.

Later studies found an empirical relation between the charge radius and the mass number, A, for heavier nuclei (A > 20):

R ≈ r_{0}A^{1/3}

where the empirical constant r_{0} of 1.2–1.5 fm can be interpreted as the Compton wavelength of the proton. This gives a charge radius for the gold nucleus (A = 197) of about 7.69 fm.

== Modern measurements ==
Modern direct measurements are based on precision measurements of the atomic energy levels in hydrogen and deuterium, and measurements of scattering of electrons by nuclei. There is most interest in knowing the charge radii of protons and deuterons, as these can be compared with the spectrum of atomic hydrogen and deuterium: the nonzero size of the nucleus causes a shift in the electronic energy levels which shows up as a change in the frequency of the spectral lines. Such comparisons are a test of quantum electrodynamics (QED).

Both scattering data and spectroscopic data are used to determine the CODATA recommended values for the proton and deuteron root-mean-square charge radii. Furthermore, spectroscopic measurements can be made both with regular hydrogen (consisting of a proton and an electron) or muonic hydrogen (an exotic atom consisting of a proton and a negative muon). An inconsistency between proton charge radius measurements made using different techniques was known as the proton radius puzzle, but more recent measurements show consistent results.

The CODATA recommended values for the root-mean-square charge radius of some particles are:

proton: 8.4075(64)×10^{−16} m
deuteron: 2.12778(27)×10^{−15} m
alpha particle: 1.6785(21)×10^{−15} m
