= Onium =

Quantum state of a particle and its antiparticle

An illustration of the protonium atom.

An onium (plural: onia) is a bound state of a particle and its antiparticle. These states are usually named by adding the suffix -onium to the name of one of the constituent particles (replacing an -on suffix when present), with one exception for "muonium"; a muon–antimuon bound pair is called "true muonium" to avoid confusion with old nomenclature. (Note: "Muonium" is the name assigned by IUPAC to an electron–antimuon bound state before the current convention became popular. So, despite its name, muonium is not a bound muon–antimuon onium. A muon–antimuon bound state is called "true muonium" to reduce confusion.)

== Examples ==
Positronium is an onium which consists of an electron and a positron bound together as a long-lived metastable state. Positronium has been studied since the 1950s to understand bound states in quantum field theory. A recent development called non-relativistic quantum electrodynamics (NRQED) used this system as a proving ground.

Pionium, a bound state of two oppositely charged pions, is interesting for exploring the strong interaction. This should also be true of protonium. The true analogs of positronium in the theory of strong interactions are the quarkonium states: they are mesons made of a heavy quark and antiquark (namely, charmonium and bottomonium). Exploration of these states through non-relativistic quantum chromodynamics (NRQCD) and lattice QCD are increasingly important tests of quantum chromodynamics.

Understanding bound states of hadrons such as pionium and protonium is also important in order to clarify notions related to exotic hadrons such as mesonic molecules and pentaquark states.

== See also ==
- Exotic atom
- Exciton — solid-state analog of positronium
