= Luigi Di Lella =

Italian experimental particle physicist

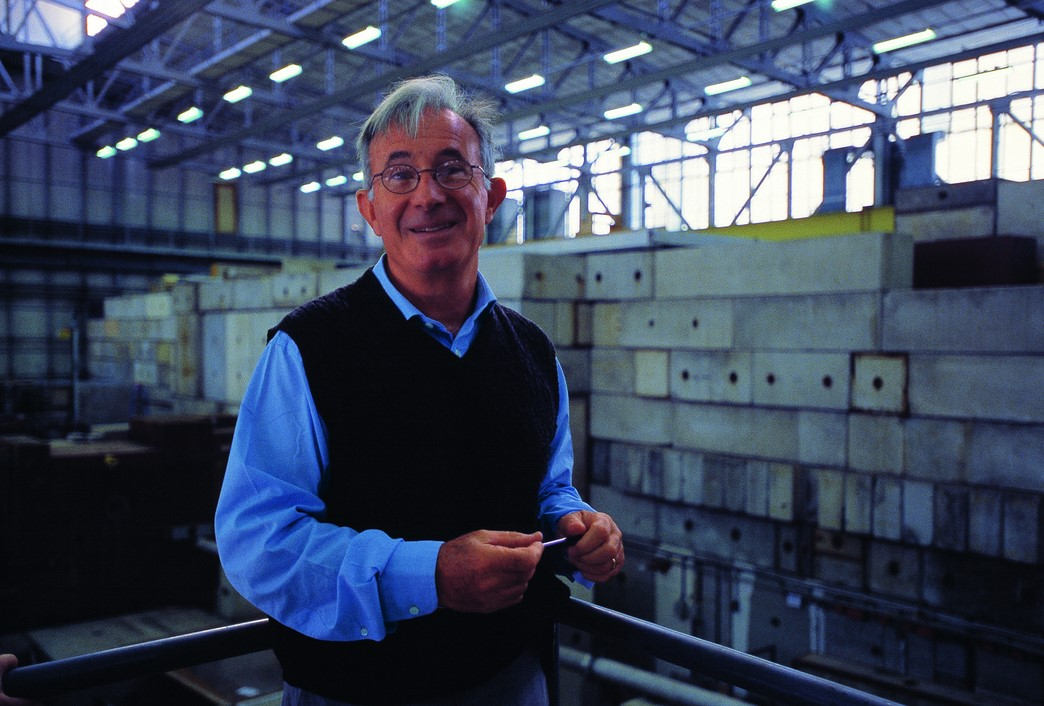
- Luigi Di Lella
- Born: 7 December 1937 (age 88); Naples, Italy
- Education: University of Pisa
- Known for: Former spokesperson of the UA2 collaboration
- Scientific career
- Fields: Physics (particle physics)
- Workplaces: CERN, University of Pisa

Luigi Di Lella (born in Naples, 7 December 1937) is an Italian experimental particle physicist. He has been a staff member at CERN for over 40 years, and has played an important role in major experiments at CERN such as CAST and UA2. From 1986 to 1990 he acted as spokesperson for the UA2 Collaboration, which, together with the UA1 Collaboration, discovered the W and Z bosons in 1983.

== Education ==
After moving from his child-hood home in Naples, Italy, Di Lella studied physics at the University of Pisa and Scuola Normale Superiore in Pisa. Di Lella obtained his doctoral degree in 1959 from the University of Pisa on the subject of muon capture. Written under the supervision of Marcello Conversi, his thesis was on the measurement of longitudinal polarization of neutrons emitted from muon capture in nuclei (in Italian, unpublished).

== Career and research ==
Following his degree, Di Lella continued his work with Marcello Conversi, now at the University of Rome. He was commuting between Rome and CERN, using the Synchrocyclotron at CERN as an accelerator for his experiments, before he in 1961 secured a two-year position as a Fellow at CERN.

In the 1950s physicist had started to wonder why processes like the decay of a positive muon to a positron and a photon, μ^{+}→e^{+} + γ, or electron emission from nuclear capture of a negative muon, μ^{−} + N → N + e^{−}, were not observed. Given the knowledge of that time, there was no reason why these reactions could not exist – energy, charge and spin are conserved. Di Lella took part in two consecutive experiments with increased sensitivity on the search for electron emission from nuclear capture of negative muons, strengthening the hypothesis that muon and electron have different quantum number (today named "lepton flavour"). The definitive experimental proof of this hypothesis was achieved in 1962 in the first high-energy neutrino experiment at the Brookhaven 30 GeV Alternating Gradient Synchrotron (AGS), by showing that neutrinos from π^{+}→μ^{+} + ν only produced muons, and not electrons, when interacting in the detector, a result for which Leon Lederman, Mel Schwartz and Jack Steinberger shared the 1988 Nobel Prize in Physics.

From 1964 to 1968 Di Lella held a position as a Research Physicist at CERN. During this time he took part in experiments at the Proton Synchrotron (PS), on high-energy elastic scattering of hadrons from polarized targets, discovering unexpected spin effects in the diffractive region, with opposite sign for π^{+} and π^{−}.

The following year, Di Lella became an Associate Professor of Physics at Columbia University, New York, a position he held for two years, until 1970.

After receiving an offer from CERN for an indefinite appointment as a Research Physicist, Di Lella returned to CERN in 1970. The construction of the Intersecting Storage Rings (ISR) at CERN, the world's first hadron collider, had recently been completed. While still at Columbia University, Di Lella, together with physicists from CERN, Columbia and Rockefeller University, wrote a proposal for an ISR experiment to search for high-mass electron-positron pairs. The experiment, known as R-103, had two large detectors at 90 degrees to the beam directions at opposite azimuth angles, to detect electrons, positrons and photons and to measure their energies and angles. It soon found an unexpected high rate of high-energy photons from the decay of neutral mesons (π^{0}) emitted at large angles to the beams. Because in the early 1970s there were no high-capacity hard disks, nor sophisticated data acquisition systems, data were written onto magnetic tapes at a rate that could not exceed 10 events per second (even so, a magnetic tape became full after 15 minutes of data taking). To keep the event rate below this limit, the electron detection threshold used in the event trigger was raised above 1.5 GeV, thus excluding from detection the yet undiscovered J/Ψ-particle with 3.1 GeV mass (this particle, a bound state of a charmed quark-antiquark pair, was discovered in 1974 at the Brookhaven AGS and at the electron-positron collider SPEAR at Stanford, and for this discovery the 1976 Nobel Prize in Physics was awarded to B. Richter and S.C.C. Ting).

The production of high-energy π^{0} mesons at large angles was soon understood as due to the strong interaction of point-like constituents of the proton (quarks, antiquarks and gluons). Evidence for electrically charged, point-like proton constituents, interacting electromagnetically with electrons, had already been found in 1968 at the Stanford Linear Collider at SLAC from deep-inelastic electron scattering experiments, for which J. Friedman, H. Kendall and R. Taylor received the 1990 Nobel Prize in Physics 1990. The R-103 experiment found that these constituents behaved as point-like particles also when interacting strongly.

The R-103 results were in contrast with earlier theories of proton-proton collisions, which predicted that only low-energy mesons would be produced at large angles. The experiment was a step towards understanding the strong interaction between hadron constituents. Unfortunately, the discovery of high-energy π^{0} meson production at large angle prevented the more important discovery of the J/Ψ-particle.

In 1978 Di Lella was one of four senior physicist who proposed the UA2 experiment. The purpose of the experiment was to detect the production and decay of the W and Z bosons at the Proton-Antiproton Collider (Spp̅S) — a modification of the Super Proton Synchrotron (SPS). UA2, together with the UA1 collaboration, succeeded in discovering these particles in 1983, leading to the 1984 Nobel Prize in Physics being awarded to Carlo Rubbia and Simon van der Meer. UA2 was also the first experiment to observe hadronic jet production at high transverse momentum from hadronic collisions. Di Lella was the spokesperson of the UA2 experiment from 1986 to 1990, when high-luminosity operation of the Spp̅S was discontinued.

During the 1990s Di Lella became interested in neutrino oscillations. He was among the proponents of the WA96/NOMAD experiment, which aimed at searching for ν_{μ}-ν_{τ} oscillations using high-energy neutrinos (predominantly ν_{μ}) from the CERN SPS, and he became the spokesperson for the experiment in 1995. Guided by a theoretical conjecture that the 3rd neutrino might be the main component of dark matter in the Universe, they looked for oscillations over an average distance of ~650 m. They found no oscillations, and when these oscillations were first observed by the Super-Kamiokande experiment in Japan using neutrinos produced by cosmic rays in the Earth atmosphere, they were found to occur over distances of the order of 1000 km (T. Kajita and A. McDonald shared the 2015 Nobel Prize in Physics for the discovery of neutrino oscillations).

From 2000 until his retirement Di Lella took part in the CAST experiment (CERN Axion Solar Telescope experiment), searching for axions produced in the core of the Sun. After retiring in 2004, Di Lella has been a research associate in the schools where he did his first strides as a physicist: Scuola Normale Superiore in Pisa and University of Pisa. He is still actively working at CERN, doing experiments on charged K-meson decay at the NA62 experiment.

From 1991 to 2006 Di Lella was a supervisory editor if the journal Nuclear Physics B.

== Most Cited Publications ==
- UA2 Collaboration, 1983, 'Evidence for Z0 ---> e+ e- at the CERN anti-p p Collider', Phys. Lett. B, vol. 129, no. 1-2, pp. 130-140
- UA2 Collaboration, 1983, 'Observation of Single Isolated Electrons of High Transverse Momentum in Events with Missing Transverse Energy at the CERN anti-p p Collider', Phys. Lett B., vol. 122, no. 5-6, pp. 476-485
- CAST Collaboration, 2007, 'An Improved limit on the axion-photon coupling from the CAST experiment', JCAP 0704, vol. 2007, no. 10.
- CAST Collaboration. 2004, 'First results from the CERN Axion Solar Telescope (CAST)', Phys. Rev. Letter, vol. 94, no. 12, pp. 1-5
- UA2 Collaboration, 1992, 'An Improved determination of the ratio of W and Z masses at the CERN antiproton-proton collider', Phys. Letter. B, vol. 276, pp. 354-364
- UA2 Collaboration, 1987, 'Measurement of the Standard Model Parameters from a Study of W and Z Bosons', Phys. Letter. B, vol. 186, pp. 440-451
- UA2 Collaboration, 1982, 'Observation of Very Large Transverse Momentum Jets at the CERN anti-p p Collider', Phys. Lett. B, vol. 118, pp. 203-210
- F.W. Brusser et al., 1973, 'Observation of pi0 mesons with large transverse momentum in high-energy proton proton collisions', Phys. Lett. B, vol. 46, pp. 471-476
