= Kaonic hydrogen =

Exotic atom

Kaonic hydrogen is an exotic atom consisting of a negatively charged kaon orbiting a proton.

Such particles were first identified, through their X-ray spectrum, at the KEK proton synchrotron in Tsukuba, Japan in 1997. More detailed studies have been performed at DAFNE in Frascati, Italy. Kaonic hydrogen has been created in very low energy collisions of kaons with the protons in a gaseous hydrogen target. At DAFNE, kaons are produced by the decay of φ mesons which are in turn created in collisions between electrons and positrons. The experiments analyzed X-rays from several electronic transitions in kaonic hydrogen.

Unlike in the hydrogen atom, where the binding between electron and proton is dominated by the electromagnetic interaction, kaons and protons interact also to a large extent by the strong interaction. In kaonic hydrogen this strong contribution was found to be repulsive, shifting the ground state energy by 283 ± 36 (statistical) ± 6 (systematic) eV, thus making the system unstable with a resonance width of 541 ± 89 (stat) ± 22 (syst) eV (decay into Λπ and Σπ).

Kaonic hydrogen is studied mainly because of its importance for the understanding of kaon-nucleon interactions and for testing quantum chromodynamics.

== See also ==
- Kaonium
- Pionic helium
