= Kaonium =

Exotic atom

Kaonium is an exotic atom consisting of a bound state of a positively charged and a negatively charged kaon. Kaonium has not been observed experimentally and is expected to have a short lifetime on the order of 10^{−18} seconds.

Kaonium has been shown to emerge as a sharp resonance in photon-photon to meson-meson cross sections.

== See also ==
- Kaonic hydrogen
