= Electron mass =

Mass of a stationary electron

Constant	Value
m_{e}	9.1093837139(28)×10^{−31} kg
m_{e}	5.485799090441(97)×10^{−4} Da
m_{e}	0.51099895069(16) MeV/c^{2}
m_{e}c^{2}	8.1871057880(26)×10^{−14} J
m_{e}c^{2}	0.51099895069(16) MeV

In particle physics, the electron mass (symbol: m_{e}) is the mass of a stationary electron, also known as the invariant mass of the electron. It is one of the fundamental constants of physics. It has a value of about 9.109×10^{−31} kilograms or about 5.486×10^{−4} daltons i.e. unified atomic mass units (u), which has an energy-equivalent of about 8.187×10^{−14} joules or about 0.5110 MeV.

== Terminology ==
The term "rest mass" is sometimes used because in special relativity the mass of an object can be said to increase in a frame of reference that is moving relative to that object (or if the object is moving in a given frame of reference). Most practical measurements are carried out on moving electrons. If the electron is moving at a relativistic velocity, any measurement must use the correct expression for mass. Such correction becomes substantial for electrons accelerated by voltages of over 100 kV.

For example, the relativistic expression for the total energy, E, of an electron moving at speed v is
$$E = \gamma m_\mathrm{e} c^2 ,$$
where

- c is the speed of light;
- γ is the Lorentz factor, $\gamma = 1/\sqrt{1- \tfrac{v^2}{c^2}}$
- m_{e} is the "rest mass", or more simply just the "mass" of the electron.

This quantity m_{e} is frame invariant and velocity independent.

== Determination ==
Since the electron mass determines a number of observed effects in atomic physics, there are potentially many ways to determine its mass from an experiment, if the values of other physical constants are already considered known.

Historically, the mass of the electron was determined directly from combining two measurements. The mass-to-charge ratio of the electron was first estimated by Arthur Schuster in 1890 by measuring the deflection of "cathode rays" due to a known magnetic field in a cathode ray tube. Seven years later J. J. Thomson showed that cathode rays consist of streams of particles, to be called electrons, and made more precise measurements of their mass-to-charge ratio, again using a cathode ray tube.

The second measurement was of the charge of the electron. This was determined with a precision of better than 1% by Robert A. Millikan in his oil drop experiment in 1909. Together with the mass-to-charge ratio, the electron mass was determined with reasonable precision. The value of mass that was found for the electron was initially met with surprise by physicists, since it was so small (less than 0.1%) compared to the known mass of a hydrogen atom.

The electron rest mass can be calculated from the Rydberg constant R_{∞} and the fine-structure constant α obtained through spectroscopic measurements. Using the definition of the Rydberg constant:

$$R_{\infty} = \frac{m_{\rm e}c\alpha^2}{2h} ,$$

thus

$$m_{\rm e} = \frac{2R_{\infty}h}{c\alpha^2} ,$$

where c is the speed of light and h is the Planck constant. The relative uncertainty, 5×10^{−8} in the 2006 CODATA recommended value, is due entirely to the uncertainty in the value of the Planck constant. With the re-definition of kilogram in 2019, there is no uncertainty by definition left in Planck constant anymore.

The electron relative atomic mass can be measured directly in a Penning trap. It can also be inferred from the spectra of antiprotonic helium atoms (helium atoms where one of the electrons has been replaced by an antiproton) or from measurements of the electron g-factor in the hydrogenic ions ^{12}C^{5+} or ^{16}O^{7+}.

The electron relative atomic mass is an adjusted parameter in the CODATA set of fundamental physical constants, while the electron rest mass in kilograms is calculated from the values of the Planck constant, the fine-structure constant and the Rydberg constant, as detailed above.

== Relationship to other physical constants ==
The electron mass was used to calculate the Avogadro constant N_{A} before its value was fixed as a defining constant in the 2019 revision of the SI:

$$N_{\rm A} = \frac{M_{\rm u} A_{\rm r}({\rm e})}{m_{\rm e}} = \frac{M_{\rm u} A_{\rm r}({\rm e})c\alpha^2}{2R_\infty h} .$$

Hence it is also related to the atomic mass constant m_{u}:

$$m_{\rm u} = \frac{M_{\rm u}}{N_{\rm A}} = \frac{m_{\rm e}}{A_{\rm r}({\rm e})} = \frac{2R_\infty h}{A_{\rm r}({\rm e})c\alpha^2} ,$$

where

- M_{u} is the molar mass constant (defined in SI);
- A_{r}(e) is a directly measured quantity, the relative atomic mass of the electron.

m_{u} is defined in terms of A_{r}(e), and not the other way round, and so the name "electron mass in atomic mass units" for A_{r}(e) involves a circular definition (at least in terms of practical measurements).

The electron relative atomic mass also enters into the calculation of all other relative atomic masses. By convention, relative atomic masses are quoted for neutral atoms, but the actual measurements are made on positive ions, either in a mass spectrometer or a Penning trap. Hence the mass of the electrons must be added back on to the measured values before tabulation. A correction must also be made for the mass equivalent of the binding energy E_{b}. Taking the simplest case of complete ionization of all electrons, for a nuclide X of atomic number Z,

$$A_{\rm r}({\rm X}) = A_{\rm r}({\rm X}^{Z+}) + ZA_{\rm r}({\rm e}) - \frac{E_{\rm b}}{m_{\rm u}c^2}$$

As relative atomic masses are measured as ratios of masses, the corrections must be applied to both ions: the uncertainties in the corrections are negligible, as illustrated below for hydrogen 1 and oxygen 16.

Physical parameter	^{1}H	^{16}O
relative atomic mass of the X^{Z+} ion	1.00727646677(10)	15.99052817445(18)
relative atomic mass of the Z electrons	0.00054857990943(23)	0.0043886392754(18)
correction for the binding energy	−0.0000000145985	−0.0000021941559
relative atomic mass of the neutral atom	1.00782503207(10)	15.99491461957(18)

The principle can be shown by the determination of the electron relative atomic mass by Farnham et al. at the University of Washington (1995). It involves the measurement of the frequencies of the cyclotron radiation emitted by electrons and by ^{12}C^{6+} ions in a Penning trap. The ratio of the two frequencies is equal to six times the inverse ratio of the masses of the two particles (the heavier the particle, the lower the frequency of the cyclotron radiation; the higher the charge on the particle, the higher the frequency):

$$\frac{\nu_c ({}^{12}{\rm C}^{6+})}{\nu_c ({\rm e})} = \frac{6A_{\rm r}({\rm e})}{A_{\rm r}({}^{12}{\rm C}^{6+})} = 0.000\,274\,365\,185\,89(58)$$

As the relative atomic mass of ^{12}C^{6+} ions is very nearly 12, the ratio of frequencies can be used to calculate a first approximation to A_{r}(e), 5.4863037178×10^{−4}. This approximate value is then used to calculate a first approximation to A_{r}(^{12}C^{6+}), knowing that $\tfrac{E_\text{b}(^{12}\mathrm{C})}{m_{\rm u}c^2}$ (from the sum of the six ionization energies of carbon) is 1.1058674×10^{−6}: A_{r}(^{12}C^{6+}) ≈ 11.9967087236367. This value is then used to calculate a new approximation to A_{r}(e), and the process repeated until the values no longer vary (given the relative uncertainty of the measurement, 2.1×10^{−9}): this happens by the fourth cycle of iterations for these results, giving A_{r}(e) = 5.485799111(12)×10^{−4} for these data.
