= The Pod in the Barrier =

Short story by Theodore Sturgeon

"The Pod in the Barrier" is a science fiction novelette by Theodore Sturgeon. It was first published in Galaxy Science Fiction in 1957. It is a story about a group of people in a spaceship who are part of a campaign to defeat a barrier around a region of space, in order to get to the riches within. Like many stories by Sturgeon, it has characters with pronounced physical and psychological defects, and focuses on the power of love.

== Plot ==
The narrator, a brilliant, arrogant scientist named Palmer, is one of four experts on the ship, each of whom believe they know how to defeat the Barrier. Although it is easy to enter the space inside, a missile defense system will destroy any object that enters, and any object that attempts to leave the space within the Barrier is destroyed by the Barrier itself, which turns part of the object into anti-matter. Besides the experts, there is the skipper, Captain Steev, Virginia, the CG or "crew's girl", and Blum, a small, slightly deformed man who has the job of "utility monkey", which means all the menial jobs. Despite her assignment of providing "comfort" to the men on board, Virginia is withdrawn and uncommunicative. She has an unusual talent for repeating what the men say in a way that makes them disbelieve their own words.

Over the progress of the voyage Virginia is largely ignored by the men, but Blum falls in love with her. On reaching the Barrier, Captain Steev invites the experts to present their plans to the rest of the crew and passengers. When they do this, he demolishes their arguments in a way that humiliates them. They wonder why they came to the Barrier at all, if they cannot hope to breach it.

One morning Palmer awakes to find the ship running on emergency power. Blum is desperately searching for Virginia. Steev shows them that a ship's pod has arrived inside the Barrier and all the defense systems have been disabled. He tells them that Virginia is in the pod, which is approaching the control center on an asteroid. She is the reason that the systems are down and the defenses have failed. The plan was to use Virginia's psychic ability, which he calls the "doubt field" to neutralize the "cold fusion" reactors that run both the ship and the Barrier controls. Virginia's power of disbelief is such that it can affect some nuclear processes. Humiliating the experts was part of the process of preparing her to disbelieve science itself. All the Captain had to do was put her in the pod with materials explaining how the cold fusion process works. The pod would then arrive at the asteroid, burrow into its surface, and set off a thermonuclear bomb, killing Virginia as well as destroying the Barrier.

The plan appears to succeed, but as they attempt to leave the ship shuts down again. It seems that Blum's grief over Virginia has induced a lack of faith powerful enough to stop the reactor. Steev is ready to kill Blum, but they find Virginia safe in the airlock. Before the pod exploded, the race that built the barrier contacted her and told her how to use a spacesuit and jet pack to get clear. The experience taught her to believe in something, and the ship functions again.
