= Muon-catalyzed fusion =

Nuclear fusion process

Muon-catalyzed fusion (abbreviated μCF or MCF) is a process that allows nuclear fusion to occur at temperatures significantly lower than those needed for thermonuclear fusion, even at room temperature or lower. It is one of the few known ways to catalyze nuclear fusion reactions.

Muons are unstable subatomic particles that are similar to electrons but 207 times more massive. If a muon replaces one of the electrons in a hydrogen molecule, the nuclei are consequently drawn 186 times closer than in a normal molecule, due to the reduced mass being 186 times the mass of an electron. When the nuclei move closer together, the fusion probability increases, to the point where a significant number of fusion events can occur at room temperature.

Methods for obtaining muons, however, require far more energy than can be produced by the resulting fusion reactions. Muons have a mean lifetime of 2.2 μs, much longer than that of many other subatomic particles but nevertheless far too brief to allow their useful storage.

To create useful room-temperature muon-catalyzed fusion, reactors would need a cheap, efficient muon source and/or a way for each individual muon to catalyze many more fusion reactions.

== History ==
Andrei Sakharov and F. C. Frank predicted the phenomenon of muon-catalyzed fusion on theoretical grounds before 1950. Yakov Borisovich Zel'dovich also wrote about the phenomenon of muon-catalyzed fusion in 1954. Luis W. Alvarez et al., when analyzing the outcome of some experiments with muons incident on a hydrogen bubble chamber at Berkeley in 1956, observed muon-catalysis of exothermic p–d, proton and deuteron, nuclear fusion, which results in a helion, a gamma ray, and a release of about 5.5 MeV of energy. The Alvarez experimental results, in particular, spurred John David Jackson to publish one of the first comprehensive theoretical studies of muon-catalyzed fusion in his ground-breaking 1957 paper. This paper contained the first serious speculations on useful energy release from muon-catalyzed fusion. Jackson concluded that it would be impractical as an energy source, unless the "alpha-sticking problem" (see below) could be solved, leading potentially to an energetically cheaper and more efficient way to use catalyzing muons.

As of 2026, at least two companies are pursuing muon-catalyzed fusion reactors, both fueled by deuterium–tritium reactions: Acceleron Fusion, in the United States, founded in 2008 as part of NK Labs, LLC, then spun-off in 2022, and Norrønt AS, in Norway, founded in 2016 as Ultrafusion Nuclear Power, then merged with Norrønt in 2017.

== Potential benefits ==
If muon-catalyzed d–t nuclear fusion is realized practically, it will be a much more attractive way of generating power than conventional nuclear fission reactors because muon-catalyzed d–t nuclear fusion (like most other types of nuclear fusion), produces far fewer harmful (and far less long-lived) radioactive wastes.

The large number of neutrons produced in muon-catalyzed d–t nuclear fusions may be used to breed fissile fuels from fertile material – for example, thorium-232 could breed uranium-233 in this way. (Note: The breeding takes place due to certain neutron-capture nuclear reactions, followed by beta decays, the ejection of electrons and neutrinos from nuclei as neutrons within the nuclei decay into protons as a result of weak nuclear forces.) The fissile fuels that have been bred can then be "burned," either in a conventional critical nuclear fission reactor or in an unconventional subcritical fission reactor, for example, a reactor using nuclear transmutation to process nuclear waste, or a reactor using the energy amplifier concept devised by Carlo Rubbia and others.

Another benefit of muon-catalyzed fusion is that the fusion process can start with pure deuterium gas without tritium. Plasma fusion reactors like ITER or Wendelstein X7 need tritium to initiate and also need a tritium factory. Muon-catalyzed fusion generates tritium under operation and increases operating efficiency up to an optimum point when the deuterium–tritium ratio reaches about 1:1. Muon-catalyzed fusion can operate as a tritium factory and deliver tritium for material and plasma fusion research.

== Viability as a power source ==
=== Problems facing practical exploitation ===
Except for some refinements, little has changed since Jackson's 1957 assessment of the feasibility of muon-catalyzed fusion other than Vesman's 1967 prediction of the hyperfine resonant formation of the muonic (d–μ–t)^{+} molecular ion which was subsequently experimentally observed. This helped spark renewed interest in the whole field of muon-catalyzed fusion, which remains an active area of research worldwide. However, as Jackson observed in his paper, muon-catalyzed fusion is "unlikely" to provide "useful power production ... unless an energetically cheaper way of producing μ^{−}-mesons (Note: Muons are not mesons; they are leptons. However, this was unclear until 1947, and the name "mu meson" persisted for some time following the identification of the muon as a lepton.) can be found."

One practical problem with the muon-catalyzed fusion process is that muons are unstable, decaying in 2.2 μs (in their rest frame). Hence, there needs to be some cheap means of producing muons, and the muons must be arranged to catalyze as many nuclear fusion reactions as possible before decaying.

Another, and in many ways more serious, problem is the "alpha-sticking" problem, which was recognized by Jackson in his 1957 paper. (Note: Eugene P. Wigner pointed out the α-sticking problem to Jackson.) The α-sticking problem is the approximately 1% probability of the muon "sticking" to the alpha particle that results from deuteron–triton nuclear fusion, thereby effectively removing the muon from the muon-catalysis process altogether. Even if muons were absolutely stable, each muon could catalyze, on average, only about 100 d–t fusions before sticking to an alpha particle, which is only about one-fifth the number of muon catalyzed d–t fusions needed for break-even, where as much thermal energy is generated as electrical energy is consumed to produce the muons in the first place, according to Jackson's rough estimate.

More recent measurements seem to point to more encouraging values for the α-sticking probability, finding the α-sticking probability to be around 0.3% to 0.5%, which could mean as many as about 200 (even up to 350) muon-catalyzed d–t fusions per muon. Indeed, the team led by Steven E. Jones achieved 150 d–t fusions per muon (average) at the Los Alamos Meson Physics Facility. The results were promising and almost enough to reach theoretical break-even. Unfortunately, these measurements for the number of muon-catalyzed d–t fusions per muon are still not enough to reach industrial break-even. Even with break-even, the conversion efficiency from thermal energy to electrical energy is only about 40% or so, further limiting viability. The best recent estimates of the electrical "energy cost" per muon is about 6 GeV with accelerators that are (coincidentally) about 40% efficient at transforming electrical energy from the power grid into acceleration of the deuterons.

As of 2012, no practical method of producing energy through this means has been published, although some discoveries using the Hall effect show promise.

=== Breakeven alternative estimate ===
According to Gordon Pusch, a physicist at Argonne National Laboratory, various breakeven calculations on muon-catalyzed fusion omit the heat energy the muon beam itself deposits in the target. By taking this factor into account, muon-catalyzed fusion can already exceed breakeven; however, the recirculated power is usually very large compared to power out to the electrical grid (about 3–5 times as large, according to estimates). Despite this rather high recirculated power, the overall cycle efficiency is comparable to conventional fission reactors; however the need for 4–6 MW of electrical generating capacity for each megawatt out to the grid probably represents an unacceptably large capital investment. Pusch suggested using Bogdan Maglich's "migma" self-colliding beam concept to significantly increase the muon production efficiency, by eliminating target losses, and using tritium nuclei as the driver beam, to optimize the number of negative muons.

In 2021, Kelly, Hart, and Rose produced an μCF model whereby the ratio, Q, of thermal energy produced to the kinetic energy of the accelerated deuterons used to create negative pions (and thus negative muons through pion decay) was optimized. In this model, the heat energy of the incoming deuterons as well as that of the particles produced due to the deuteron beam impacting a tungsten target was recaptured to the extent possible, as suggested by Gordon Pusch in the prior paragraph. Further, heat energy due to tritium breeding in a lithium-lead shell was recaptured, as suggested by Jändel, Danos, and Rafelski in 1988. The best Q value was found to be about 130% assuming that 50% of the muons produced catalyze fusion. Further, assuming that an accelerator is 18% efficient at transforming electric energy into deuteron kinetic energy and conversion efficiency of heat energy into electric energy of 60%, they estimate that, currently, the amount of electric energy that could be produced by a μCF reactor would be 14% of the electric energy consumed. For this to improve, they suggest that some combination of increasing a) accelerator efficiency and b) the number of fusion reactions per negative muon above the assumed level of 150, is needed.

== Process ==
To create this effect, a stream of negative muons, most often created by decaying pions, is sent to a block that may be made up of all three hydrogen isotopes (protium, deuterium, and/or tritium), where the block is usually frozen, and the block may be at temperatures of about 3 kelvin (−270 °C) or so. The muon may bump the electron from one of the hydrogen isotopes. The muon, 207 times more massive than the electron, effectively shields and reduces the electromagnetic repulsion between two nuclei and draws them much closer into a covalent bond than an electron can. Because the nuclei are so close, the strong nuclear force is able to bind both nuclei together. They fuse, release the catalytic muon (most of the time), and part of the original mass of both nuclei is released as energetic particles, as with any other type of nuclear fusion. The release of the catalytic muon is critical to continue the reactions. The majority of the muons continue to bond with other hydrogen isotopes and continue fusing nuclei together. However, not all of the muons are recycled: some bond with other debris emitted following the fusion of the nuclei (such as alpha particles and helions), removing the muons from the catalytic process. This gradually reduces the rate of the reactions, as muons with which the nuclei may bond become depleted. The average number of reactions achieved in the lab can be as high as 150 d–t fusions per muon.

== Deuterium–tritium (d–t or dt) ==
In the muon-catalyzed fusion of most interest, a positively charged deuteron (d), a positively charged triton (t), and a muon essentially form a positively charged muonic molecular heavy hydrogen ion (d–μ–t)^{+}. The muon, with a rest mass 207 times greater than the rest mass of an electron, is able to drag the more massive triton and deuteron 207 times closer together to each other in the muonic (d–μ–t)^{+} molecular ion than can an electron in the corresponding electronic (d–e–t)^{+} molecular ion. The average separation between the triton and the deuteron in the electronic molecular ion is about one angstrom (100 pm), (Note: According to Cohen, S.; Judd, D.L.; Riddell, Jr., R.J. (1960). "μ-Mesonic Molecules. II. Molecular-Ion Formation and Nuclear Catalysis". Physical Review. 119 (1): 397. Bibcode:1960PhRv..119..397C. doi:10.1103/PhysRev.119.397., footnote 16, Jackson may have been overly optimistic in Appendix D of his 1957 paper in his roughly calculated "guesstimate" of the rate of formation of a muonic (p–μ–p)^{+} molecular ion by a factor of about a million or so.)) so the average separation between the triton and the deuteron in the muonic molecular ion is 207 times smaller than that. (Note: In other words, the separation in the muonic case is about 500 femtometers) Due to the strong nuclear force, whenever the triton and the deuteron in the muonic molecular ion happen to get even closer to each other during their periodic vibrational motions, the probability is very greatly enhanced that the positively charged triton and the positively charged deuteron would undergo quantum tunnelling through the repulsive Coulomb barrier that acts to keep them apart. Indeed, the quantum mechanical tunnelling probability depends roughly exponentially on the average separation between the triton and the deuteron, allowing a single muon to catalyze the d–t nuclear fusion in less than about half a picosecond, once the muonic molecular ion is formed.

The formation time of the muonic molecular ion is one of the "rate-limiting steps" in muon-catalyzed fusion that can easily take up to ten thousand or more picoseconds in a liquid molecular deuterium and tritium mixture (D_{2}, DT, T_{2}), for example. Each catalyzing muon thus spends most of its ephemeral existence of 2.2 microseconds, as measured in its rest frame, wandering around looking for suitable deuterons and tritons with which to bind.

Another way of looking at muon-catalyzed fusion is to try to visualize the ground state orbit of a muon around either a deuteron or a triton. Suppose the muon happens to have fallen into an orbit around a deuteron initially, which it has about a 50% chance of doing if there are approximately equal numbers of deuterons and tritons present, forming an electrically neutral muonic deuterium atom (d–μ)^{0} that acts somewhat like a "fat, heavy neutron" due both to its relatively small size (again, 207 times smaller than an electrically neutral electronic deuterium atom (d–e)^{0}) and to the very effective "shielding" by the muon of the positive charge of the proton in the deuteron. Even so, the muon still has a much greater chance of being transferred to any triton that comes near enough to the muonic deuterium than it does of forming a muonic molecular ion. The electrically neutral muonic tritium atom (t–μ)^{0} thus formed will act somewhat like an even "fatter, heavier neutron," but it will most likely hang on to its muon, eventually forming a muonic molecular ion, most likely due to the resonant formation of a hyperfine molecular state within an entire deuterium molecule D_{2} (d=e^{2}=d), with the muonic molecular ion acting as a "fatter, heavier nucleus" of the "fatter, heavier" neutral "muonic/electronic" deuterium molecule ([d–μ–t]=e^{2}=d), as predicted by Vesman, an Estonian graduate student, in 1967.

Once the muonic molecular ion state is formed, the shielding by the muon of the positive charges of the proton of the triton and the proton of the deuteron from each other allows the triton and the deuteron to tunnel through the Coulomb barrier in time span of order of a nanosecond The muon survives the d–t muon-catalyzed nuclear fusion reaction and remains available (usually) to catalyze further d–t muon-catalyzed nuclear fusions. Each exothermic d–t nuclear fusion releases about 17.6 MeV of energy in the form of a "very fast" neutron having a kinetic energy of about 14.1 MeV and an alpha particle α (a helium-4 nucleus) with a kinetic energy of about 3.5 MeV. Another 4.8 MeV can be gleaned by having the fast neutrons moderated in a suitable "blanket" surrounding the reaction chamber, with the blanket containing lithium-6, which nuclei, known by some as "lithions," readily and exothermically absorb thermal neutrons, the lithium-6 being transmuted thereby into an alpha particle and a triton. (Note: "Thermal neutrons" are neutrons that have been "moderated" by giving up most of their kinetic energy in collisions with the nuclei of the "moderating materials" or moderators, cooling down to "room temperature" and having a thermalized kinetic energy of about 0.025 eV, corresponding to an average "temperature" of about 300 K or so.)

== Deuterium–deuterium and other types ==
The first kind of muon-catalyzed fusion to be observed experimentally, by L.W. Alvarez et al., was protium (H or _{1}H^{1}) and deuterium (D or _{1}H^{2}) muon-catalyzed fusion. The fusion rate for p–d (or pd) muon-catalyzed fusion has been estimated to be about a million times slower than the fusion rate for d–t muon-catalyzed fusion. (Note: In principle, of course, p–d nuclear fusion could be catalyzed by the electrons present in DO "heavy-ish" water molecules that naturally occur at the level of 0.0154% in ordinary water (H_{2}O). However, because the proton and the deuteron would be more than 200 times farther apart in the case of the electronic HDO molecule than in the case of the muonic (p–μ–d)^{+} molecular ion, Jackson estimates that the rate of p–d "electron"-catalyzed fusion (eCF) is about 38 orders of magnitude (10^{38}) slower than the rate of p–d muon-catalyzed fusion (μCF), which Jackson estimates to be about 10^{6} per second, so p–d "electron"-catalyzed fusions (eCF) is expected to occur at a rate of about 10^{−32} per second, meaning that one p–d "electron"-catalyzed fusion (eCF) might occur once every 10^{24} years or so.)

Of more practical interest, deuterium–deuterium muon-catalyzed fusion has been frequently observed and extensively studied experimentally, in large part because deuterium already exists in relative abundance and, like protium, deuterium is not at all radioactive. Tritium rarely occurs naturally, and is radioactive with a half-life of about 12.5 years.

The fusion rate for d–d muon-catalyzed fusion has been estimated to be only about 1% of the fusion rate for d–t muon-catalyzed fusion, but this still gives about one d–d nuclear fusion every 10 to 100 picoseconds or so. However, the energy released with every d–d muon-catalyzed fusion reaction is only about 20% or so of the energy released with every d–t muon-catalyzed fusion reaction. Moreover, the catalyzing muon has a probability of sticking to at least one of the d–d muon-catalyzed fusion reaction products that Jackson in this 1957 paper estimated to be at least 10 times greater than the corresponding probability of the catalyzing muon sticking to at least one of the d–t muon-catalyzed fusion reaction products, thereby preventing the muon from catalyzing any more nuclear fusions. Effectively, this means that each muon catalyzing d–d muon-catalyzed fusion reactions in pure deuterium is only able to catalyze about one-tenth of the number of d–t muon-catalyzed fusion reactions that each muon is able to catalyze in a mixture of equal amounts of deuterium and tritium, and each d–d fusion only yields about one-fifth of the yield of each d–t fusion, thereby making the prospects for useful energy release from d–d muon-catalyzed fusion at least 50 times worse than the already dim prospects for useful energy release from d–t muon-catalyzed fusion.

Potential "aneutronic" (or substantially aneutronic) nuclear fusion possibilities, which result in essentially no neutrons among the nuclear fusion products, are almost certainly not very amenable to muon-catalyzed fusion. One such essentially aneutronic nuclear fusion reaction involves a deuteron from deuterium fusing with a helion (He^{+2}) from helium-3, which yields an energetic alpha particle and a much more energetic proton, both positively charged (with a few neutrons coming from inevitable d–d nuclear fusion side reactions). However, one muon with only one negative electric charge is incapable of shielding both positive charges of a helion from the one positive charge of a deuteron. The chances of the requisite two muons being present simultaneously are exceptionally remote.

== In culture ==
The term "cold fusion" was coined to refer to muon-catalyzed fusion in a 1956 New York Times article about Luis W. Alvarez's paper.

In 1957 Theodore Sturgeon wrote a novelette, "The Pod in the Barrier", in which humanity has ubiquitous cold fusion reactors that work with muons. The reaction is "When hydrogen one and hydrogen two are in the presence of Mu mesons, they fuse into helium three, with an energy yield in electron volts of 5.4 times ten to the fifth power". Unlike the thermonuclear bomb contained in the Pod (which is used to destroy the Barrier) they can become temporarily disabled by "concentrated disbelief" that muon fusion works.

In Sir Arthur C. Clarke's third novel in the Space Odyssey series, 2061: Odyssey Three, muon-catalyzed fusion is the technology that allows mankind to achieve easy interplanetary travel. The main character, Heywood Floyd, compares Luis Alvarez to Lord Rutherford for underestimating the future potential of their discoveries.

== See also ==
- List of nuclear fusion companies
