= Muonium =

Type of atom

A muonium atom

Muonium (/mjuː.ˈoʊ.ni.əm/, mew-OH-nee-əm) is an exotic atom made up of an antimuon and an electron, which was discovered in 1960 by Vernon W. Hughes and is given the chemical symbol Mu. During the muon's 2.2 µs lifetime, muonium can undergo chemical reactions.

== Description ==
Because, like a proton, the antimuon's mass is much larger than that of the electron, muonium (μ^{+}e^{−}) is more similar to atomic hydrogen (p^{+}e^{−}) than positronium (e^{+}e^{−}). Its Bohr radius and ionization energy are within 0.5% of hydrogen, deuterium, and tritium, and thus it can usefully be considered an exotic light isotope of hydrogen.

== Properties ==
Although muonium is short-lived, physical chemists study it using muon spin spectroscopy (μSR), a magnetic resonance technique analogous to nuclear magnetic resonance (NMR) or electron spin resonance (ESR) spectroscopy. Like ESR, μSR is useful for the analysis of chemical transformations and the structure of compounds with novel or potentially valuable electronic properties. Muonium is usually studied by muon spin rotation, in which the muonium atom's spin precesses in a magnetic field applied transverse to the muon spin direction (since muons are typically produced in a spin-polarized state from the decay of pions), and by avoided level crossing (ALC), which is also called level crossing resonance (LCR). The latter employs a magnetic field applied longitudinally to the polarization direction, and monitors the relaxation of muon spins caused by "flip/flop" transitions with other magnetic nuclei.

Because the muon is a lepton, the atomic energy levels of muonium can be calculated with great precision from quantum electrodynamics (QED), unlike in the case of hydrogen, where the precision is limited by uncertainties related to the internal structure of the proton. For this reason, muonium is an ideal system for studying bound-state QED and also for searching for physics beyond the Standard Model.

== Nomenclature ==
Normally in the nomenclature of particle physics, an atom composed of a positively charged particle bound to an electron is named after the positive particle with "-ium" replacing an "-on" suffix, in this case "muium". Replacing "-on" with (or otherwise appending) "-onium" is mostly used for bound states of a particle with its own antiparticle. The exotic atom consisting of a muon and an antimuon (which is yet to be observed) is known as true muonium.

== See also ==
- Muonic hydrogen
- Muon-catalyzed fusion
