= Marcello Conversi =

Italian physicist and computer scientist (1917–1988)

- Born: July 14, 1917; Tivoli, Lazio, Italy
- Died: 22 September 1988 (aged 71); Rome, Italy
- Known for: Experimental evidence of the muon
- Scientific career
- Fields: Particle physics
- Workplaces: CERN; University of Pisa; University of Chicago; University of Rome

Marcello Conversi (August 25, 1917 – September 22, 1988) was an Italian particle physicist. He is best known for his 1946 cosmic ray experiment where he showed that the "mesotron", now known as the muon, was not a strongly interacting particle.

Conversi studied under Enrico Fermi at the University of Rome, and received his doctorate in 1940, doing his thesis under Bruno Ferretti. During World War II, Conversi remained in Italy, doing research and teaching at the University of Rome. Together with Oreste Piccioni and Ettore Pancini he conducted the experiment that Luis Walter Alvarez, Nobel Prize laureate of 1968, called the "start of modern particle physics" in his Nobel lecture. In 1946, they showed that the "mesotron", now known as the muon, which had been discovered in 1937 by Seth Neddermeyer and Carl David Anderson, was not the particle predicted by Hideki Yukawa as mediator of the strong force. If the "mesotron", a cosmic ray particle of negative charge, was indeed the meson postulated by Yukawa, it should be captured without decaying.

Conversi, Piccioni and Pancini moved their experiment to a high school to avoid air raids. In their experimental setup negative and positive particles were separated by large pieces of magnetized iron on the roof of the high school. The negative particles were absorbed in matter. After switching from iron to graphite absorbers, the 1946 experiment dramatically showed that the negatively charged component of cosmic rays decayed radioactive rather than being captured by the graphite.

From 1946 to 1947 Conversi held a position as a post-doctoral fellow at the University of Chicago, before he returned to Italy as a Professor of Experimental Physics and Director of the Physics Institute at the University of Pisa. During his time in Pisa, he founded the Centro Studi Calcolatrici Elettroniche (CSCE), where the first Italian computer was built. For this work he received the gold medal of the President of Italy in 1961. He also developed a new track detector, known as the flash chamber — a precursor to the spark chamber — which went on to become the standard tool in particle and cosmic ray physics.

In 1958 he returned to the University of Rome, as a Professor of Advanced Physics. He had two appointments as director of the institute, one from 1960 to 1962 and the second from 1964 to 1966. His influential school, from 1950 at Pisa and from 1958 at Rome, produced many famous Italian particle physicists, such as Marcello Cresti, Carlo Rubbia and Luigi Di Lella.

From 1962 to 1964, and again from 1975 to 1977, Conversi was affiliated CERN. At CERN, Conversi was a member of the Scientific Committee from 1969 to 1975, becoming its vice-president. From 1959, he participated in a series of quests at the Synchro-Cyclotron (CERN) for “forbidden” processes in weak interaction. When the new Super Proton Synchrotron began its operation in 1976 he played a prominent role in searches for short-lived particles using a stack of nuclear emulsion coupled to the BEBC bubble chamber.

Conversi was vice president of Italian National Institute of Nuclear Physics from 1967 to 1970.

He was a fellow of the American Physical Society since 1950 and a member of the Italian science academy.
