= Protonium =

Bound state of a proton and antiprotron

An illustration of the protonium atom.

Protonium, also known as antiprotonic hydrogen, is a type of exotic atom in which a proton (symbol: p) and an antiproton (symbol: p̅) are bound to each other.

Since protonium is a bound system of a particle and its corresponding antiparticle, it is an example of a type of exotic atom called an onium.

Protonium has a mean lifetime of approximately 1.0 μs and a binding energy of −0.75 keV.

Like all onia, protonium is a boson with all quantum numbers (baryon number, flavour quantum numbers, etc.) and electrical charge equal to 0.

== Production ==
There are two known methods to generate protonium. One method involves violent particle collisions. The other method involves putting antiprotons and protons into the same magnetic cage. The latter method was first used during the experiment ATHENA (ApparaTus for High precision Experiment on Neutral Antimatter) at the CERN laboratory in Geneva in 2002, but it was not until 2006 that scientists realized protonium was also generated during the experiment.

Reactions involving a proton and an antiproton at high energies give rise to multiparticle final states. In fact, such reactions are the basis of particle colliders such as the Tevatron at Fermilab. Indirect searches for protonium at LEAR (Low Energy Antiproton Ring at CERN) have used antiprotons impinging on nuclei such as helium, with unclear results. Very low energy collisions in the range of 10 eV to 1 keV may lead to the formation of protonium.

== Studies ==
Planned experiments will use traps as the source of low-energy antiprotons. Such a beam would be allowed to impinge on atomic hydrogen targets in the field of a laser, which is meant to excite the bound proton–antiproton pairs into an excited state of protonium with some efficiency (whose computation is an open theoretical problem). Unbound particles are rejected by bending them in a magnetic field. Since the protonium is uncharged, it will not be deflected by such a field. This undeflected protonium, if formed, would be allowed to traverse a meter of high vacuum, within which it is expected to decay via annihilation of the proton and antiproton. The decay products would give unmistakable signatures of the formation of protonium.

Theoretical studies of protonium have mainly used non-relativistic quantum mechanics. These give predictions for the binding energy and lifetime of the states. Computed lifetimes are in the range of 0.1 to 10 microseconds. Unlike the hydrogen atom, in which the dominant interactions are due to the Coulomb attraction of the electron and the proton, the constituents of protonium interact predominantly through the strong interaction. Thus multiparticle interactions involving mesons in intermediate states may be important. Hence the production and study of protonium would be of interest also for the understanding of internucleon forces.

== See also ==
- Positronium
- Antiprotonic helium
- Antiproton Collector
- Antiproton Accumulator
