= Exotic atom =

Atoms composed of exotic particles

An exotic atom is an otherwise normal atom in which one or more subatomic particles have been replaced by other particles. For example, electrons may be replaced by other negatively charged particles such as muons (muonic atoms) or pions (pionic atoms). Because these substitute particles are usually unstable, exotic atoms typically have very short lifetimes and no exotic atom thus far observed can persist under normal conditions.

== Muonic atoms ==
Muonic helium, with a muon and electron orbiting a normal helium nucleus

In a muonic atom (previously called a mu-mesic atom, now known to be a misnomer as muons are not mesons), an electron is replaced by a muon, which, like the electron, is a lepton. Since leptons are only sensitive to weak, electromagnetic and gravitational forces, muonic atoms are governed to very high precision by the electromagnetic interaction.

Since a muon is more massive than an electron, the Bohr orbits are closer to the nucleus in a muonic atom than in an ordinary atom, and corrections due to quantum electrodynamics are more important. Study of muonic atoms' energy levels as well as transition rates from excited states to the ground state therefore provide experimental tests of quantum electrodynamics.

Other muonic atoms can be formed when negative muons interact with ordinary matter. The muon in muonic atoms can either decay or get captured by a proton. Muon capture is very important in heavier muonic atoms, but shortens the muon's lifetime from 2.2 μs to only 0.08 μs.

=== Muonic hydrogen ===
Muonic hydrogen is like normal hydrogen with the electron replaced by a negative muon, which is to say, a proton orbited by a muon. It is important in addressing the proton radius puzzle.

Muonic hydrogen atoms can form muonic hydrogen molecules. The spacing between the nuclei in such a molecule is hundreds of times smaller than in a normal hydrogen molecule –so close that the nuclei can spontaneously fuse together. This is known as muon-catalyzed fusion, and was first observed between hydrogen-1 and deuterium nuclei in 1957. Muon-catalyzed fusion has been proposed as a means of generating energy using fusion reactions in a room-temperature reactor.

=== Muonic helium (Hydrogen-4.1) ===
The symbol ^{4.1}H (Hydrogen-4.1) has been used to describe the exotic atom muonic helium (^{4}He-μ), which is like helium-4 in having two protons and two neutrons. However one of its electrons is replaced by a muon, which also has charge –1. Because the muon's orbital radius is less than 1/200 of the electron's orbital radius (due to the mass ratio), the muon can be considered as a part of the nucleus. The atom then has a nucleus with two protons, two neutrons and one muon, with total nuclear charge +1 (from two protons and one muon) and only one electron outside, so that it is effectively an isotope of hydrogen instead of an isotope of helium. A muon's weight is approximately 0.1 Da so the isotopic mass is 4.1. Since there is only one electron outside the nucleus, the hydrogen-4.1 atom can react with other atoms. Its chemical behavior is more like a hydrogen atom than an inert helium atom.

== Hadronic atoms ==
A hadronic atom is an atom in which one or more of the orbital electrons are replaced by a negatively charged hadron. Possible hadrons include mesons such as the pion or kaon, yielding a pionic atom or a kaonic atom (see kaonic hydrogen), collectively called mesonic atoms; antiprotons, yielding an antiprotonic atom; and the Σ^{−} particle, yielding a Σ^{−} or sigmaonic atom.

Unlike leptons, hadrons can interact via the strong force, so the orbitals of hadronic atoms are influenced by nuclear forces between the nucleus and the hadron. Since the strong force is a short-range interaction, these effects are strongest if the atomic orbital involved is close to the nucleus, when the energy levels involved may broaden or disappear because of the absorption of the hadron by the nucleus. Hadronic atoms, such as pionic hydrogen and kaonic hydrogen, thus provide experimental probes of the theory of strong interactions, quantum chromodynamics.

== Onium ==
An onium (plural: onia) is the bound state of a particle and its antiparticle. The classic onium is positronium, which consists of an electron and a positron bound together as a metastable state, with a relatively long lifetime of 142 ns in the triplet state. Positronium has been studied since the 1950s to understand bound states in quantum field theory. A recent development called non-relativistic quantum electrodynamics (NRQED) used this system as a proving ground.

Pionium, a bound state of two oppositely charged pions, is useful for exploring the strong interaction. This should also be true of protonium, which is a proton–antiproton bound state. Understanding bound states of pionium and protonium is important in order to clarify notions related to exotic hadrons such as mesonic molecules and pentaquark states. Kaonium, which is a bound state of two oppositely charged kaons, has not been observed experimentally yet. However, it has been shown that kaonium emerges as a sharp resonance in photon-photon to meson-meson cross sections.

The true analogs of positronium in the theory of strong interactions, however, are not exotic atoms but certain mesons, the quarkonium states, which are made of a heavy quark such as the charm or bottom quark and its antiquark. (Top quarks are so heavy that they decay through the weak force before they can form bound states.) Exploration of these states through non-relativistic quantum chromodynamics (NRQCD) and lattice QCD are increasingly important tests of quantum chromodynamics.

Muonium, despite its name, is not an onium state containing a muon and an antimuon, because IUPAC assigned that name to the system of an antimuon bound with an electron. However, the production of a muon–antimuon bound state, which is an onium (called true muonium), has been theorized. The same applies to the ditauonium (or "true tauonium") exotic QED atom.

== Hypernuclear atoms ==
Atoms may be composed of electrons orbiting a hypernucleus that includes strange particles called hyperons. Such hypernuclear atoms are generally studied for their nuclear behaviour, falling into the realm of nuclear physics rather than atomic physics.

== Quasiparticle atoms ==
In condensed matter systems, specifically in some semiconductors, there are states called excitons, which are bound states of an electron and an electron hole.

== Exotic molecules ==
An exotic molecule contains one or more exotic atoms.

- Di-positronium, two bound positronium atoms
- Positronium hydride, a positronium atom bound to a hydrogen atom

"Exotic molecule" can also refer to a molecule having some other uncommon property such as pyramidal hexamethylbenzene and a Rydberg atom.

== See also ==
- Antihydrogen
- Antiprotonic helium
- Borromean nucleus
- Exotic matter
- Halo nucleus
- Kaonic hydrogen
- Lattice QCD
- Muonium
- Neutronium
- Pionium
- Positronium
- Quantum chromodynamics
- Quantum electrodynamics
- Quarkonium
