= Femtometre =

Unit of length

femtometre
- The helium atom and its nucleus in femtometres

General information
- Unit system: SI
- Unit of: length
- Symbol: fm

Conversions
1 fm in ...	... is equal to ...
- SI base units: 10^{−15} m
- Natural units: 6.1877×10^{19} ℓ_{P} 1.8897×10^{−5} a_{0}
- imperial/US units: 3.9370×10^{−14} in

The femtometre (American spelling femtometer), symbol fm, (derived from the Danish and Norwegian word femten 'fifteen', Ancient Greek: μέτρον, romanized: metron, lit. 'unit of measurement') is a unit of length in the International System of Units (SI) equal to 10^{−15} metres, which means a quadrillionth of one metre. This distance is sometimes called a fermi and was so named in honour of Italian naturalized to American physicist Enrico Fermi, as it is a typical length-scale of nuclear physics.

== Definition and equivalents ==
1000000 zeptometres = 1 femtometre = 1 fermi = 0.000001 nanometre = 10^{−15} metres

1000000000000 femtometres = 1 millimetre.

For example, the charge radius of a proton is approximately 0.841 femtometres while the radius of a gold nucleus is approximately 8.45 femtometres.

1 barn = 100 fm^{2}

== History ==
The femtometre was adopted by the 11th Conférence Générale des Poids et Mesures, and added to the SI in 1964, using the Danish word for "15" and the similarity in spelling with fermi.

The fermi is named after the Italian physicist Enrico Fermi (1901–1954), one of the founders of nuclear physics. The term was coined by Robert Hofstadter in a 1956 paper published in Reviews of Modern Physics entitled "Electron Scattering and Nuclear Structure". The term is widely used by nuclear and particle physicists. When Hofstadter was awarded the 1961 Nobel Prize in Physics, it subsequently appeared in the text of his 1961 Nobel Lecture, "The electron-scattering method and its application to the structure of nuclei and nucleons" (December 11, 1961).
