= Spurion =

Fictitious field in quantum field theory

In theoretical physics, a spurion is a fictitious, auxiliary field in a quantum field theory that can be used to parameterize any symmetry breaking and to determine all operators invariant under the symmetry.

The procedure begins with finding a parameter that measures the amount of symmetry breaking. This parameter is promoted to a field, i.e. to a function of the spacetime coordinates. With this new fictitious field, operators that are invariant under the symmetry may be found by the usual group-theoretical considerations.

The list of operators found in this way is complete as long as all sources of the breaking are included. The operators in the actual theory are ultimately found by setting the spurious field equal to the constant value of the parameter.

== Applications ==
In the theory of pions, physics often uses the chiral perturbation theory. Here, the relevant symmetry is the isospin SU(2) symmetry. It is broken by the different masses of up and down quarks, as well as by their different charges. The chiral Lagrangian may be extended to an exactly SU(2)-symmetric Lagrangian by promoting these parameters (mass and charge) to fields that break the symmetry spontaneously.

Calculations of observables to higher orders may be done with the spurion fields. The final result, at any order of accuracy, is obtained by substituting the right masses and charges.

In the standard electroweak theory, the spurion is replaced by an actual field, the Higgs boson. However, in alternative theories of electroweak symmetry breaking, e.g. those based on Technicolor, the spurion techniques are important to derive the physical predictions.
