= Seth Neddermeyer =

American physicist (1907–1988)

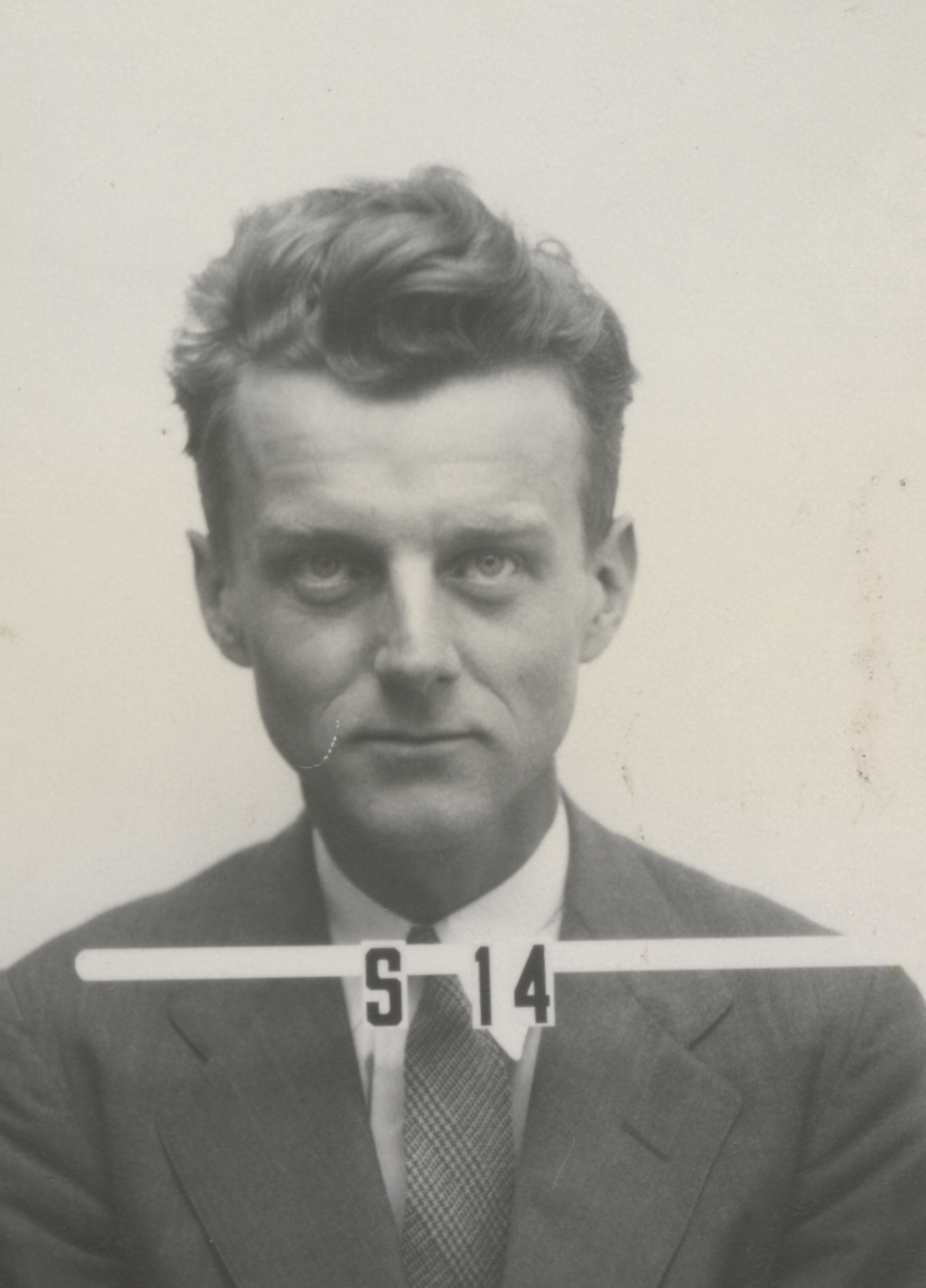
- Neddermeyer's ID badge photo from Los Alamos
- Born: Seth Henry Neddermeyer; September 16, 1907; Richmond, Michigan, United States
- Died: January 29, 1988 (aged 80); Seattle, Washington, United States
- Education: Stanford University (AB); California Institute of Technology (MS, PhD)
- Known for: Co-discoverer of the muon; Implosion-type atomic bomb
- Awards: Enrico Fermi award (1982)
- Scientific career
- Fields: Physics
- Workplaces: National Bureau of Standards; Los Alamos Laboratory; University of Washington
- Thesis: The absorption of high energy electrons (1935)
- Doctoral advisor: Carl D. Anderson

Seth Henry Neddermeyer (September 16, 1907 – January 29, 1988) was an American physicist who co-discovered the muon, and later championed the implosion-type nuclear weapon while working on the Manhattan Project at the Los Alamos Laboratory during World War II.

== Early life ==
Seth Henry Neddermeyer was born in Richmond, Michigan, on September 16, 1907. He attended Olivet College, a small college that his mother, older sister, and uncle had also attended, for two years before his family moved to California. He transferred to Stanford University, from which received his Bachelor of Arts (AB) degree in 1929. His interest in physics was inspired by the work of Robert A. Millikan, and he enrolled in graduate school at California Institute of Technology (Caltech), where he wrote his 1935 PhD thesis on "The absorption of high energy electrons", under the supervision of Carl D. Anderson. He confirmed the theory espoused by Niels Bohr for this process. He also noted large radiative energy losses of electrons in lead, in agreement with the theory propounded by Hans Bethe and Walter Heitler.

Neddermeyer contributed to the research which led to the 1932 discovery of the positron, for which Anderson was awarded the Nobel Prize in Physics in 1936. That year, Neddermeyer and Anderson discovered the muon, using cloud chamber measurements of cosmic rays. Hideki Yukawa's 1935 theory of mesons had postulated a particle with a mass between that of the electron and the proton as mediating the nuclear force. For several years it was thought that the muon was this particle but it became clear that it could not be, since it did not interact with nuclear matter via the strong force. This was shown in an 1948 experiment carried out by Marcello Conversi, Oreste Piccioni, and Ettore Pancini. Yukawa's particle was the pi meson. The muon is now understood to be one of three charged leptons of the Standard Model.

Anderson and Neddermeyer collaborated with Millikan in high altitude studies of cosmic rays, which confirmed Robert Oppenheimer's theory that the air showers produced in the atmosphere by cosmic rays contained electrons. They also obtained the first evidence that gamma rays can generate positrons.

== Manhattan Project work ==
Implosion mechanism

In early 1941, with World War II raging in Europe but the United States not yet a belligerent, Neddermeyer joined a team led by Charles C. Lauritsen and William A. Fowler at the Department of Terrestrial Magnetism at the Carnegie Institution of Washington, and then at the National Bureau of Standards in Washington, D.C., that worked on the photoelectric proximity fuze. After this work was completed, Neddermeyer was recruited by Oppenheimer to work at the Manhattan Project's Los Alamos Laboratory. Neddermeyer was an early advocate for the development of an implosion technique for assembling a critical mass in an atomic bomb. Although implosion was suggested by Richard Tolman as early as 1942 and discussed in the introductory lectures given to Los Alamos scientists by Robert Serber, Neddermeyer was one of the first to urge its full development. Unable to find much initial enthusiasm for the concept among his fellow Los Alamos scientists, Neddermeyer presented the first substantial technical analysis of implosion in late April 1943. Oppenheimer considered this to be the beginning of implosion research at Los Alamos.

Though many remained unimpressed, Oppenheimer appointed Neddermeyer the head of a new group to test implosion. His group became the E-5 (Implosion) Group, which was part of Captain William S. Parsons' E Division. A gun-type nuclear weapon was the preferred method, but implosion research constituted a backup. Neddermeyer embarked on an intensive series of experiments testing cylindrical implosions. The result was a series of distorted shapes. Progress was made; Neddermeyer and a member of his team, Hugh Bradner, along with James L. Tuck from the British Mission, conceived the idea of explosive lenses, in which shaped charges are used to focus the force of an explosion. Nevertheless, seemingly unsolvable problems with shock wave uniformity brought progress on implosion to a crawl.

By September 1943, Neddermeyer's team had grown from five people to fifty. That month, John von Neumann came to Los Alamos at Oppenheimer's request. Von Neumann was impressed by the implosion concept and, working with Edward Teller, an old friend, made a series of suggestions. Von Neumann was able to create a sound mathematical model of implosion, enabling Neddermeyer to present a proposal for a greatly expanded research program. Edwin McMillan and Isidor Isaac Rabi recommended that George Kistiakowsky, who had a specialized knowledge in the precision use of explosives, be brought in to help the program. In February 1944, Kistiakowsky became Parsons' deputy for implosion.

In April 1944, tests on the first sample of plutonium that had been produced with neutrons in a nuclear reactor revealed that reactor-bred plutonium contained five times more plutonium-240 than that hitherto produced in cyclotrons. This unwanted isotope that spontaneously decayed and produced neutrons promised to cause a predetonation without sufficiently quick critical mass assembly. It now became apparent that only implosion would work for practical plutonium bombs; a powerful enough gun could not be constructed small enough to be carried in an aircraft, and plutonium-240 was even more difficult to separate from plutonium-239 than the isotopes of uranium that were giving the rest of the Manhattan Project such difficulties. Plutonium was unusable unless implosion worked, but only plutonium could be produced in quantities that would allow regular production of atomic bombs. Thus, the implosion technique now suddenly stood as the key to production of nuclear weapons.

In mid-June 1944, a report from Kistiakowsky to Oppenheimer detailing dysfunctionality within the implosion team led to the ousting of Neddermeyer. He was replaced as the head of the E-5 Group by Kistiakowsky on June 15, 1944, but remained a technical adviser to the implosion program, with group leader status. Neddermeyer was said to have been much embittered by this episode. In Oppenheimer's August 1944 reorganization of the Los Alamos Laboratory, Neddermeyer's group was renamed X-1, with Norris Bradbury as group leader. The implosion method championed by Neddermeyer was used in the first atom bomb exploded (in the Trinity test), the Fat Man bomb dropped on Nagasaki, and almost all modern nuclear weapons. Kistiakowsky later insisted that "the real invention should be given full credit to [Seth] Neddermeyer" (sic).

== Later years ==
In 1946, after World War II ended, Neddermeyer left Los Alamos to become an associate professor at the University of Washington, where he would spend the rest of his career. In due course he became a full professor. He resumed his studies of cosmic rays using a cloud chamber and a new device that he invented to measure the speed of charged particles known as a "chronotron". He was particularly interested in the properties of the muon, and conducted experiments with muons at SLAC. He participated in the DUMAND Project, for which he helped design large-scale underwater neutrino detectors. Neddermeyer became interested in parapsychology, insisting, in spite of the skepticism of many colleagues, that it warranted proper scientific investigation. He retired in 1973, becoming a professor emeritus, but he continued his research activities for as long as his health permitted. He was afflicted with Parkinson's disease.

In 1982, he was presented with the Department of Energy's Enrico Fermi award. His citation read:

For participating in the discovery of the positron, for his share in the discovery of the muon, the first of the subatomic particles; for his invention of the implosion technique for assembling nuclear explosives; and for his ingenuity, foresight, and perseverance in finding solutions for what at first seemed to be unsolvable engineering difficulties.

In later life, Neddermeyer was sometimes troubled by the nuclear weapons he had helped to invent. He told an interviewer in 1983:

I get so overwhelmed by a feeling of terrible guilt when I think about the history of the bomb. I'm terribly worried now about the current world situation. What the hell can we do about it?

Neddermeyer died in Seattle on January 29, 1988, from complications of Parkinson's disease.

== In popular culture ==
Neddermeyer is portrayed by Colin Bennett in the 1980 BBC series Oppenheimer, by Joe D'Angerio in Fat Man and Little Boy, and by Devon Bostick in the Christopher Nolan-directed film Oppenheimer (2023).
