= True muonium =

Predicted exotic atom

A diagram of a true muonium atom.

In particle physics, true muonium is a theoretically predicted exotic atom representing a bound state of a muon and an antimuon (μ^{+}μ^{−}). The existence of true muonium is well established theoretically within the Standard Model. Its properties within the Standard Model are determined by quantum electrodynamics, and may be modified by physics beyond the Standard Model.

True muonium is yet to be observed experimentally, though it may have been produced in experiments involving collisions of electron and positron beams. The ortho-state of true muonium (i.e. the state with parallel alignment of the muon and antimuon spins) is expected to be relatively long-lived (with a lifetime of 1.8×10^{−12} s), and decay predominantly to an e^{+}e^{−} pair, which makes it possible for LHCb experiment at CERN to observe it with the dataset collected by 2025.

== Experimental research ==
There are several experimental projects searching for the true muonium. One of them is the μμ-tron experiment (Mumutron) planned at the Budker Institute of Nuclear Physics of the Siberian Branch of the Russian Academy of Sciences (INP SB RAS), which has been under development since 2017. The experiment involves the creation of a special low-energy electron–positron collider, which will make it possible to observe the production of true muonium in collisions of electron and positron beams with an intersection angle of 75° with energies of 408 MeV. Thus, the invariant mass of colliding particles will be equal to twice the mass of the muon (m_{μ} = 105.658 MeV/c^{2}). To register the exotic atom (in the decay channel into an electron–positron pair), it is planned to create a specialized detector. Apart to the actual detection of true muonium, it is planned to isolate its various states and measure their lifetimes.

In addition to experiments in the field of elementary particle physics, the collider created within the framework of the experiment is also of interest from the point of view of developing accelerator technologies for the Super Charm-Tau factory planned at the INP SB RAS. The experiment was proposed in 2017 by E. B. Levichev, A. I. Milshtein, and V. P. Druzhinin, researchers at the INP SB RAS.

== See also ==
- Muonium
- Positronium
- Onium
