= Bohr radius =

Unit of length about the size of a hydrogen atom

- Symbol: a_{0} or r_{Bohr}
- Named after: Niels Bohr

Approximate values
- SI units: 5.29×10^{−11} m (52.9 pm)

The Bohr radius ($a_0$) is a physical constant, approximately equal to the most probable distance between the nucleus and the electron in a hydrogen atom in its ground state. It is named after Niels Bohr, due to its role in the Bohr model of an atom. Its value is 5.29177210544(82)×10^{−11} m. The name "bohr" was also suggested for this unit.

== Definition and value ==
The Bohr radius is defined as
$$a_0
= \frac{4 \pi \varepsilon_0 \hbar^2}{e^2 m_{\text{e}}}
= \frac{\hbar}{m_{\text{e}} c \alpha}
,$$
where

- $\varepsilon_0$ is the permittivity of free space,
- $\hbar$ is the reduced Planck constant,
- $m_{\text{e}}$ is the mass of an electron,
- $e$ is the elementary charge,
- $c$ is the speed of light in vacuum, and
- $\alpha$ is the fine-structure constant.

The CODATA value of the Bohr radius is 5.29177210544(82)×10^{−11} m (52.9177210462–52.9177210626 pm).

== History ==
Picture of a hydrogen atom using the Bohr model

In the Bohr model for atomic structure, put forward by Niels Bohr in 1913, electrons orbit a central nucleus under electrostatic attraction. The original derivation posited that an electron is constrained to have orbital angular momentum that is an integer multiple of the reduced Planck constant, which successfully matched the observation of discrete energy levels in emission spectra, as well as predicting a fixed radius for each of these levels. In the simplest atom, hydrogen, a single electron orbits the nucleus, and its smallest possible orbit, with the lowest energy, has an orbital radius almost equal to the Bohr radius. (It is not exactly the Bohr radius due to the reduced mass effect. They differ by about 0.05%.)

The Bohr model of the atom was superseded by an electron wave function adhering to the Schrödinger equation as published in 1926. This is further complicated by spin and quantum vacuum effects to produce fine structure and hyperfine structure. Nevertheless, the Bohr radius formula remains central in atomic physics calculations, due to its simple relationship with fundamental constants (this is why it is defined using the true electron mass rather than the reduced mass, as mentioned above). As such, it became the unit of length in the system of atomic units.

In Schrödinger's quantum-mechanical theory of the hydrogen atom, the Bohr radius is the value of the radial coordinate for which the radial probability density for observing the electron position is highest. The expected value of the radial distance of the electron, by contrast, is $\tfrac{3}{2} a_0$.

== Related constants ==
The Bohr radius is one of a set of related lengths, the others being the reduced Compton wavelength of the electron ($\lambda\!\!\!\bar{}_{\mathrm{e} }$), the classical electron radius ($r_{\mathrm{e} }$), and the angular wavelength of a photon of energy one hartree ($\hbar c/E_\text{h} = 1/(4\pi R_\infty)$). Any one of these constants can be written in terms of any of the others using the fine-structure constant $\alpha$:

$$r_{\mathrm{e}} = \alpha \lambda\!\!\!\bar{}_{\mathrm{e}} = \alpha^2 a_0 = \alpha^3 (\hbar c/E_\text{h}) .$$

== Hydrogen atom and similar systems ==
The Bohr radius including the effect of reduced mass in the hydrogen atom is given by

$$a_0^* = \frac{m_\text{e}}{\mu}a_0 ,$$

where $\mu = m_\text{e} m_\text{p} / (m_\text{e} + m_\text{p})$ is the reduced mass of the electron–proton system (with $m_\text{p}$ being the mass of proton). The use of reduced mass is a generalization of the two-body problem from classical physics beyond the case in which the approximation that the mass of the orbiting body is negligible compared to the mass of the body being orbited. Since the reduced mass of the electron–proton system is a little bit smaller than the electron mass, the "reduced" Bohr radius is slightly larger than the Bohr radius ($a^*_0 \approx 1.00054\, a_0 \approx 5.2946541 \times 10^{-11}$ m).

This result can be generalized to other systems, such as positronium (an electron and a positron orbiting each other) and muonium (an electron orbiting an anti-muon) by using the reduced mass of the system and considering the possible change in charge. Typically, Bohr model relations (radius, energy, etc.) can be easily modified for these exotic systems (up to lowest order) by simply replacing the electron mass with the reduced mass for the system (as well as adjusting the charge when appropriate). For example, the radius of positronium is approximately $2\,a_0$, since the reduced mass of the positronium system is half the electron mass ($\mu_{\text{e}^-,\text{e}^+} = m_\text{e}/2$).

A hydrogen-like atom will have a Bohr radius that scales primarily as $r_{Z}=a_0/Z$, with $Z$ being the number of protons in the nucleus. Meanwhile, the reduced mass ($\mu$) only becomes better approximated by $m_\text{e}$ in the limit of increasing nuclear mass. These results are summarized in the equation

$$r_{Z,\mu} = \frac{m_\text{e}}{\mu}\frac{a_0}{Z} .$$

A table of approximate relationships is given below.

System	Radius
Hydrogen	$a_0^*=1.00054\, a_0$
Positronium	$2\, a_0$
Muonium	$1.0048\, a_0$
He^{+}	$a_0/2$
Li^{2+}	$a_0/3$

== See also ==
- Bohr magneton
- Rydberg energy
