= Proton radius puzzle =

Measurement discrepancy in physics

The proton radius puzzle was a problem in physics relating to the size of the proton. Historically the proton charge radius was measured by two independent methods, which converged to a value of about 0.877 fm. This value was challenged by a 2010 experiment using a third method, which produced a radius about 4% smaller than this, at 0.842 fm. New experimental results reported in the autumn of 2019 agree with the smaller measurement, as does a re-analysis of older data published in 2022. It is widely believed that this difference has been resolved, and the Particle Data Group reports a consensus value of 0.8409(4) fm. A study reported in 2026 gives a value of 0.8406 fm.

== Radius definition ==
The radius of the proton is defined by a formula which can be calculated by quantum electrodynamics and be derived from either atomic spectroscopy or by electron–proton scattering. The formula involves a form-factor related to the two-dimensional parton diameter of the proton.

== Problem ==
Prior to 2010, the proton charge radius was measured using one of two methods: one relying on spectroscopy, and one relying on nuclear scattering.

=== Spectroscopy method ===
The spectroscopy method compares the energy levels of spherically symmetric 2s orbitals to asymmetric 2p orbitals of hydrogen, a difference known as the Lamb shift. The exact values of the energy levels are sensitive to the distribution of charge in the nucleus since the 2s levels overlap more with the nucleus. Measurements of hydrogen's energy levels are now so precise that the accuracy of the proton radius is the limiting factor when comparing experimental results to theoretical calculations. This method produces a proton radius of about 0.8768(69) fm, with approximately 1% relative uncertainty.

=== Electron–proton scattering ===
Similar to Rutherford's scattering experiments that established the existence of the nucleus, modern electron–proton scattering experiments send beams of high energy electrons into 20cm long tube of liquid hydrogen. The resulting angular distribution of the electron and proton are analyzed to produce a value for the proton charge radius. Consistent with the spectroscopy method, this produces a proton radius of about 0.8775(5) fm.

=== 2010 experiment ===
In 2010, Pohl et al. published the results of an experiment relying on muonic hydrogen as opposed to normal hydrogen. Conceptually, this is similar to the spectroscopy method. However, the much higher mass of a muon causes it to orbit 207 times closer than an electron to the hydrogen nucleus, where it is consequently much more sensitive to the size of the proton. The resulting radius was recorded as 0.842(1) fm, 5 standard deviations (5σ) smaller than the prior measurements. The newly measured radius is 4% smaller than the prior measurements, which were believed to be accurate within 1%. (The new measurement's uncertainty limit of only 0.1% makes a negligible contribution to the discrepancy.)

A follow-up experiment by Pohl et al. in August 2016 used a deuterium atom to create muonic deuterium and measured the deuteron radius. This experiment allowed the measurements to be 2.7 times more accurate, but also found a discrepancy of 7.5 standard deviations smaller than the expected value.

== Proposed resolutions ==
=== New physics ===
The uncertain nature of the experimental evidence did not stop theorists from attempting to explain the conflicting results. Among the postulated explanations were a three-body force, interactions between gravity and the weak force, or a flavour-dependent interaction, higher dimension gravity, a new boson, and the quasi-free π^{+} hypothesis.

=== Measurement artefact ===
Randolf Pohl, the original investigator of the puzzle, stated that while it would be "fantastic" if the puzzle led to a discovery, the most likely explanation is not new physics but some measurement artefact. His personal assumption is that past measurements have misgauged the Rydberg constant and that the current official proton size is inaccurate.

=== Quantum chromodynamic calculation ===
In a paper by Belushkin et al. (2007), including different constraints and perturbative quantum chromodynamics, a smaller proton radius than the then-accepted 0.877 femtometres was predicted.

=== Proton radius extrapolation ===
Papers from 2016 suggested that the problem was with the extrapolations that had typically been used to extract the proton radius from the electron scattering data though these explanation would require that there was also a problem with the atomic Lamb shift measurements.

=== Data analysis method ===
In one of the attempts to resolve the puzzle without new physics, Alarcón et al. (2018) of Jefferson Lab have proposed that a different technique to fit the experimental scattering data, in a theoretically as well as analytically justified manner, produces a proton charge radius from the existing electron scattering data that is consistent with the muonic hydrogen measurement. Effectively, this approach attributes the cause of the proton radius puzzle to a failure to use a theoretically motivated function for the extraction of the proton charge radius from the experimental data. Another recent paper has pointed out how a simple, yet theory-motivated change to previous fits will also give the smaller radius.

=== More recent spectroscopic measurements ===
In 2017 a new approach using a cryogenic hydrogen and Doppler-free laser excitation to prepare the source for spectroscopic measurements; this gave results ~5% smaller than the previously accepted spectroscopic values with much smaller statistical errors. This result was close to the 2010 muon spectroscopy result. These authors suggest that the older spectroscopic analysis did not include quantum interference effects that alter the shape of the hydrogen lines.

In 2019, another experiment for the spectroscopy Lamb shift used a variation of Ramsey interferometry that does not require the Rydberg constant to analyze. Its result, 0.833 fm, agreed with the smaller 2010 value once more.

=== More recent electron–proton scattering measurements ===
Also in 2019 W. Xiong et al. reported a similar result using extremely low momentum transfer electron scattering. Their results support the smaller proton charge radius, but do not explain why the results before 2010 came out larger.

=== 2022 analysis ===
A re-analysis of experimental data, published in February 2022, found a result consistent with the smaller value of approximately 0.84 fm.

=== 2026 atomic spectral results ===
High precision measurements of the 2s-6p electronic transition in atomic hydrogen reported in 2026 give a proton radius value of 0.8406(15) fm in excellent agreement with predictions from the standard model.
