= Pionium =

Composite particle of two mesons

Pionium is a composite particle consisting of one π^{+} and one π^{−} meson. It can be created, for instance, by interaction of a proton beam accelerated by a particle accelerator and a target nucleus. Pionium has a short lifetime, predicted by chiral perturbation theory to be 2.89×10^{−15} s (i.e. 2.89 femtoseconds). It decays mainly into two π^{0} mesons, and to a smaller extent into two photons.

It has been investigated at CERN to measure its lifetime. The Dimeson Relativistic Atomic Complex (DIRAC) experiment at the Proton Synchrotron was able to detect 21,227 atomic pairs from a total of 1.5×10^{9} events, which allows the pionium lifetime to be determined to within statistical errors of 9%.

In 2006, the NA48/2 collaboration at CERN published an evidence for pionium production and decay in decays of charged kaons, studying mass spectra of daughter pion pairs in the events with three pions in the final state K^{±} → π^{±}(ππ)_{atom} → π^{±}π^{0}π^{0}. This was followed by a precision measurement of the S-wave pion scattering length, published by the collaboration in 2009.

The results of the above experiments will provide crucial tests of low-energy QCD predictions.

== See also ==
- Mesonic molecule
- Onium
