= Helion (chemistry) =

Helium-3 isotope nucleus

A helion (symbol h) is the nucleus of a helium atom, a doubly positively charged cation. The term helion is a portmanteau of helium and ion, and in practice refers specifically to the nucleus of the helium-3 isotope, consisting of two protons and one neutron. The nucleus of the other (and far more common) stable isotope of helium, helium-4, consisting of two protons and two neutrons, is called an alpha particle or an alpha for short.

This particle is the daughter product in the beta-minus decay of tritium, an isotope of hydrogen:

^{3}_{1}H	→	^{3}_{2}He	+	e^{−}	+	ν̅_{e}

CODATA reports the mass of a helion particle as m_{h} = 5.0064127862(16)×10^{−27} kg = 3.014932246932(74) Da.

Helions are intermediate products in the proton–proton chain reaction in stellar fusion.

An antihelion is the antiparticle of a helion, consisting of two antiprotons and an antineutron.
