= Mesonic molecule =

Hypothetical particle in physics

A mesonic molecule is a set of two or more mesons bound together by the strong force. Unlike baryonic molecules, which form the nuclei of all elements in nature save hydrogen-1, a mesonic molecule has yet to be definitively observed. The X(3872) discovered in 2003 and the Z(4430) discovered in 2007 by the Belle experiment are the best candidates for such an observation.

== See also ==
- Meson
- Pionium
- Tetraquark
