= Antiprotonic helium =

Exotic matter with an antiproton in place of an electron

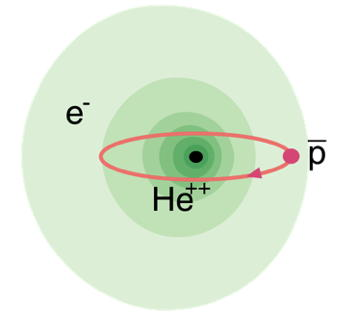
Schematic drawing of an antiprotonic helium atom.

Antiprotonic helium is a three-body atom composed of an antiproton and an electron orbiting around a helium nucleus. It is thus made partly of matter, and partly of antimatter. The atom is electrically neutral, since an electron and an antiproton each have a charge of −1 e, whereas a helium nucleus has a charge of +2 e. It has the longest lifetime of any experimentally produced matter–antimatter bound state.

== Production ==
These exotic atoms can be produced by mixing antiprotons with ordinary helium gas; the antiproton spontaneously displaces one of the two electrons contained in a normal helium atom in a chemical reaction, and then begins to orbit the helium nucleus in the electron's place. This will happen in the case of approximately 3% of the antiprotons introduced to the helium gas. The antiproton's orbit, which has a large principal quantum number and angular momentum quantum number of around 38, lies far away from the surface of the helium nucleus. The antiproton can thus orbit the nucleus for tens of microseconds, before finally falling to its surface and annihilating. This contrasts with other types of exotic atoms of the form p̅X^{+}, which typically decay within picoseconds.

== Laser spectroscopy ==
Antiprotonic helium atoms are under study by the ASACUSA experiment at CERN. In these experiments, the atoms are first produced by stopping a beam of antiprotons in helium gas. The atoms are then irradiated by powerful laser beams, which cause the antiprotons in them to resonate and jump from one atomic orbit to another.

As in spectroscopy of other bound states, Doppler broadening and other effects present challenges to precision. Researchers use a variety of techniques to obtain accurate results. One way to exceed Doppler-limited precision is two-photon spectroscopy. The ASACUSA Collaboration has studied p̅^{3}He^{+} and p̅^{4}He^{+} atoms with the p̅ occupying a high Rydberg state with large principal and orbital quantum numbers, $n \sim l + 1 \sim$ 38 using 2-photon spectroscopy. Counterpropagating Ti:Sapphire lasers with pulses of duration 30−100 ns excited nonlinear 2-photon transitions in the deep UV, including spectral lines of wavelengths, $\lambda =$ 139.8, 193.0 and 197.0 nm. These lines correspond to transitions between states of the form $(n, l) \rightarrow (n-2, l-2)$. Such transitions are improbable. However, the probability is increased by a factor of 10^{5} when the laser frequencies sum to within 10 GHz of an intermediate state $(n-1, l-1)$. States were selected pairwise such that Auger emission to p̅He^{2+} and rapid annihilation produced a detectable Čerenkov signal. The reduced Doppler shift resulted in narrower spectral lines accurate to between 2.3 and 5 ppb. Comparison of the results with three-body quantum electrodynamics calculations made possible a determination of the antiproton to electron mass ratio of 1836.1526736(23).

In 2022 ASACUSA found unexpected narrowing of antiprotonic helium spectral lines.

== Measurement of the mass ratio between the antiproton and electron ==
By measuring the particular frequency of the laser light needed to resonate the atom, the ASACUSA experiment determined the mass of the antiproton, which they measured at 1836.1536734(15) times more massive than an electron. This is the same as the mass of a "regular" proton, within the level of certainty of the experiment. This is a confirmation of a fundamental symmetry of nature called CPT (short for charge, parity, and time reversal). This law says that all physical laws would remain unchanged under simultaneous reversal of the charge axis, parity of the space axes, and the orientation of the time axis. One important prediction of this theory is that particles and their antiparticles should have exactly the same mass.

== Comparison of antiproton and proton masses and charges ==
By comparing the above results on laser spectroscopy of antiprotonic helium with separate high-precision measurements of the antiproton's cyclotron frequency carried out by the ATRAP and BASE collaborations at CERN, the mass and electric charge of the antiproton can be precisely compared with the proton values. The most recent such measurements show that the antiproton's mass (and the absolute value of the charge) is the same as the proton's to a precision of 0.5 parts in a billion.

== Antiprotonic helium ions ==
An antiprotonic helium ion is a two-body object composed of a helium nucleus and orbiting antiproton. It has an electric charge of +1 e. Cold ions with lifetimes of up to 100 ns were produced by the ASACUSA experiment in 2005.

== Pionic helium ==
In 2020 ASACUSA in collaboration with the Paul Scherrer Institut (PSI) reported the experimental verification of long lived pionic helium by spectroscopic measurements, the first time on an exotic atom containing a meson. Its existence had been predicted in 1964 by George Condo at University of Tennessee to explain some anomalies from bubble chamber tracks but no definite proof of its existence had ever been obtained. In the experiment negatively charged pions from a ring cyclotron were magnetically focused into a tank filled with superfluid helium so that they would expel an electron from the atom and take its place. Later, to confirm the production, laser light was fired at various frequencies until they found a specific one at 1631 nm where the pion would resonate, undergoing a quantum jump from its orbit into an inner one and eventually into the nucleus which would break down into a proton, a neutron and a deuteron. The experiment proved highly technical to perform and took 8 years, including the design and construction of the experiment.

== See also ==
- Positronium
- Protonium
