= Dilling =

Dilling may refer to:

- Dilling people, an ethnic group of Sudan
- Dilling language, language spoken by the Dilling people, part of the Nubian branch of the Nilo-Saharan family
- Dilling, Sudan, a city in Sudan
- Dilling, a village in Østfold, Norway
  - Dilling Station – Railway station in Moss, Norway

People with the surname Dilling include:

- Walter James Dilling (1886–1950), Scottish pharmacologist
- Elizabeth Dilling (1894–1966), American activist and writer in the 1930s and 1940s
- George W. Dilling – American politician
- Jens Dilling – Laboratory director in Canada
- Jim Dilling (born 1985), American high jumper
- Lisa Dilling – Climate scientist
- Mildred Dilling

== See also ==
- Dill (disambiguation)
