= Dill (disambiguation) =

Dill (Anethum graveolens) is an annual herb.

Dill may also refer to:

== People ==
- Dill (surname), a list of people with the surname
- Dill (footballer) (born 1974), Brazilian retired footballer Elpídio Barbosa Conceição
- Dill Faulkes (born 1944), British businessman and philanthropist
- Dill Jones (1923–1984), Welsh jazz pianist
- Dill., standard abbreviation for German botanist Johann Jacob Dillen Dillenius (1684–1747)

== Places ==
- Dill Township, Ontario, Canada
- Dill (river), Germany
- Dill, Germany, a municipality in Rhineland-Palatinate
- Dill, Tennessee, United States, an unincorporated community
- Dill Creek, New York, United States

== Other uses ==
- Dill (restaurant), the first restaurant in Iceland to be awarded a Michelin star (in 2017)
- Dill Records, a small record label
- Dill Railway, a railway in Germany
- Dill Harris, a fictional character in the novel To Kill a Mockingbird
- Dill Building, Boston, Massachusetts, United States, on the National Register of Historic Places
- Dill School, Cleburne County, Arkansas, United States, a former school on the National Register of Historic Places
- "Dill", a Russian language offensive term for someone of Ukrainian descent
- Dill the Dog, a character in the children's television series The Herbs

== See also ==
- Dil (disambiguation)
- Dil Pickles, a cartoon character from Rugrats
- Dilli (disambiguation)
