= Latifa Elouadrhiri =

Moroccan physicist

- Born: Rabat, Morocco
- Education: Mohammed V University (B.Sc. 1984); Mohammed V University (M.Sc., 1986); University of Clermont-Ferrand (Ph.D., 1993)
- Scientific career
- Fields: Experimental Particle Physics
- Institutions: Thomas Jefferson National Accelerator Facility
- Doctoral advisor: Prof. Pierre Y. Bertin

Latifa Elouadrhiri is a Moroccan experimental physicist and researcher at Thomas Jefferson National Accelerator Facility studying elementary particle physics and nuclear physics. She has worked significantly with the CLAS collaboration in Jefferson Lab's Hall B, performing 3D imaging of nucleons. Additionally, she is the spokesperson of the Deeply Virtual Compton Scattering (DVCS) experiment, studying Generalized Parton Distributions .

Elouadrhiri is a fellow of the American Physical Society, and has served as a member of the Department of Energy (DOE) Nuclear Science Advisory Committee (NSAC) and the DOE Nuclear Physics (NP) Committee of Visitors (COV).

== Childhood ==
Latifa Elouadrhiri’s was born in Morocco she was one of eight children. She was born to a mother who had never been to school and couldn't read or write but who supported them and "believed in the power of education." Elouadrhiri became fascinated with physics when she first took a physics class in high school. When she turned 15 she got her first physics book from a flea market.

== Education ==
Elouadrhiri obtained a physics B.Sc. from Mohammed V University in 1984, continuing to complete a M.Sc. in theoretical physics in 1987 entitled Poincare and Lorentz group (Group Theory). She continued to complete a Diplôme des Etudes Approfondies at the University of Blaise Pascal, Clermont-Ferrand in particle physics in 1987 entitled Development of Drift Chamber tracking Program. Following this, she completed her PhD in 1991 in physics, also at the University of Blaise Pascal, Clermont-Ferrand in experimental hadronic physics with electromagnetic probes, producing a thesis entitled Measurement of the Nucleon Axial Form Factor from Low Energy Pion Electroproduction (Saclay nuclear physics experiment)

== Career ==
At an American Physical Society meeting her work got the attention of Nathan Isgur who at the time was the chief scientist and Jefferson Lab. In 1994, Elouadrhiri chose to come to Jefferson Laboratory for a joint appointment with CNU, joining the lab as a staff scientist in 2001 as one of the first female staff scientists in the physics division. Here, she led the measurement of the first observation of electron beam asymmetries in polarized, exclusive Deeply Virtual Compton Scattering. From 2006 to 2015, Elouadrhiri was the Project Manager for the Hall B 12 GeV Upgrade, including all detectors, magnets and infrastructure for the CLAS12 system.

== Other ==
In 2015, Elouadrhiri was interviewed for an article in the Chicago Tribune about the impacts of women in science and engineering.

In 2018, she was personally recognized by the US Embassy in Rabat for her contributions to nuclear physics on both the official embassy Twitter and Facebook pages.

== Honors and awards ==
- 2010 Inducted a Fellow of the American Physical Society
- 2021 Received the Jesse W. Beams Award
