= Hermann A. Grunder =

Swiss-American physicist and national laboratory director (1931–2026)

- Born: Hermann August Grunder; December 4, 1931; Basel, Switzerland
- Died: October 23, 2026 (aged 94)
- Education: Karlsruhe Institute of Technology (master's degree, 1958); University of Basel (PhD, 1967)
- Known for: Development of the Bevalac; founding directorship of Jefferson Lab; adoption of superconducting radio-frequency technology at CEBAF
- Awards: Secretary of Energy's Gold Award (2004); Francis G. Slack Award (2012); IEEE Particle Accelerator Science and Technology Award (2018)
- Scientific career
- Fields: Accelerator physics, nuclear physics
- Workplaces: Lawrence Berkeley National Laboratory; Thomas Jefferson National Accelerator Facility; Argonne National Laboratory

Hermann August Grunder (December 4, 1931 – October 23, 2026) was a Swiss-American accelerator and nuclear physicist, and scientific administrator. He was the founding director of the Thomas Jefferson National Accelerator Facility (Jefferson Lab) in Newport News, Virginia, from 1985 to 2000, and directed Argonne National Laboratory from 2000 to 2005.

Grunder is particularly associated with the decision to build the Continuous Electron Beam Accelerator Facility (CEBAF) as a recirculating, superconducting radio-frequency (SRF) electron accelerator rather than using the previously proposed room-temperature accelerator and pulse-stretching ring. The design enabled high-duty-factor electron beams for nuclear-physics research and was subsequently upgraded from an initial design energy of 4 GeV to 12 GeV.

== Early life and education ==
Grunder was born in Basel, Switzerland, on December 4, 1931. Historian Catherine Westfall, drawing on a 1999 oral-history interview, described Grunder's recollections of growing up in Switzerland during the Second World War and his subsequent decision to seek work in the United States. He moved to California in 1959 with his first wife and their three children. He earned a master's degree in mechanical engineering from Karlsruhe Institute of Technology in Karlsruhe, Germany, in 1958 and a Ph.D. in experimental nuclear physics at the University of Basel in 1967. His doctoral research concerned a nuclear reaction involving polarized deuterons. He became a naturalized United States citizen in 1978.

== Career ==
=== Lawrence Berkeley Laboratory, 1959–1985 ===
Grunder joined the mechanical engineering department of Lawrence Berkeley Laboratory in 1959, working on the Bevatron accelerator. From 1962 to 1964, he led operations and commissioning activities for the laboratory's 88-Inch Cyclotron. Following his doctorate, he worked on accelerator beam dynamics, the development of beam-extraction systems, and the operation of heavy-ion accelerators.

In the early 1970s, the laboratory linked the SuperHILAC heavy-ion linear accelerator to the Bevatron, forming the Bevalac. The project was based on a proposal by physicist Albert Ghiorso and was implemented under the leadership of Grunder and other Berkeley accelerator specialists. Commissioned in 1974, the combined facility supplied relativistic heavy-ion beams for nuclear-physics experiments, and its beams were also used in biomedical research, including investigations of heavy-ion radiotherapy.

Beginning in the mid-1970s, Grunder directed planning for an upgrade that would extend Bevalac operations to heavier ions. The resulting modifications included a new injector and better vacuum systems. In 1982, the Bevalac accelerated uranium beams, extending its range of experimental applications.

Grunder became an associate director of Berkeley Laboratory and head of its Accelerator and Fusion Research Division in 1979. In 1982–1983, he served as a special assistant for advanced facilities at the United States Department of Energy in Washington, D.C. He returned to Berkeley as deputy director for general sciences in October 1983, holding that position until April 1985.

=== Jefferson Lab and CEBAF, 1985–2000 ===
In May 1985, Grunder became the first director of CEBAF, which was being developed by the Southeastern Universities Research Association (SURA) for the Department of Energy in Newport News, Virginia. The planned facility was intended to produce electron beams for studying the structure of nuclei and nucleons. Its original concept used a conventional room-temperature linear accelerator and a pulse-stretcher ring to produce a nearly continuous beam.

Grunder commissioned a review of the proposed technology and supported replacing that design with a recirculating electron linear accelerator using superconducting niobium radio-frequency (SRF) cavities. The adoption of SRF was a consequential engineering decision, as the technology had not previously been used on the intended scale. Its reduced resistive energy losses made it practical to produce electron beams with a high duty factor, while the recirculating configuration allowed electrons to gain energy through repeated passes. The initial design also allowed for subsequent increases in beam energy.

Construction began in February 1987 and the accelerator installation was completed in December 1993. A beam reached an experimental hall in 1994, and the laboratory began its experimental nuclear-physics program in 1995. The facility was formally dedicated as the Thomas Jefferson National Accelerator Facility in 1996. A contemporary Department of Energy announcement described the approximately $600 million construction project as completed on schedule and within budget.

CEBAF was initially designed for electron beams of up to 4 GeV. It subsequently operated at higher energies, and an upgrade to 12 GeV was completed in 2017. The original SRF-based design was an important basis for the facility's ability to undergo those upgrades.

Grunder also developed university–laboratory research connections through joint and bridge appointments, helped establish the Becoming Enthusiastic About Math and Science (BEAMS) outreach program for school students, and supported the laboratory's free-electron laser program and contacts with industry. His efforts to expand the laboratory's footprint included support for an Applied Research Center adjacent to Jefferson Lab. He remained director until 2000.

=== Argonne National Laboratory, 2000–2005 ===
Grunder was appointed director of Argonne National Laboratory, effective 1 November 2000. The laboratory, managed at the time by the University of Chicago, conducted research across the physical and biological sciences, computation, materials, energy, and engineering.

His tenure emphasized collaboration between Argonne and the university. According to the University of Chicago, by September 2004 the two institutions shared about 100 joint appointments and had established joint centers and programs in areas including astrophysics, biology, computation, environmental science, and nanotechnology. Grunder also supported multi-laboratory planning for nuclear energy and advanced computing.

A 2005 report in Physics Today noted increased use of Argonne's Advanced Photon Source by biological researchers and improved ties with the University of Chicago as developments during his directorship. In April 2005 he stepped down and was succeeded by astrophysicist Robert Rosner.

=== Scientific advisory work ===
Grunder served on scientific advisory panels dealing with nuclear science, accelerator technology, and national research facilities. He chaired a 1992 subcommittee of the Department of Energy's Basic Energy Sciences Advisory Committee studying neutron sources and was involved in deliberations that informed plans for accelerator-driven spallation neutron sources. He later advised projects including the Spallation Neutron Source, the Facility for Rare Isotope Beams, and the National Ignition Facility.

He also held leadership roles in the American Physical Society (APS) Division of Physics of Beams and participated in advisory committees for other accelerator and laboratory programs.

== Death ==
Grunder died on October 23, 2026, at the age of 94.

== Honors and recognition ==
Grunder's awards included:

- The Alexander von Humboldt Foundation's U.S. Senior Scientist Award (1979).
- The Department of Energy Distinguished Associate Award (1996).
- The Secretary of Energy's Gold Award, conferred in 2004 for national laboratory leadership.
- The Francis G. Slack Award of the APS Southeastern Section (2012), recognizing service to physics in the southeastern United States.
- The IEEE Nuclear and Plasma Sciences Society's Particle Accelerator Science and Technology Award (2018).

Grunder received honorary doctorates from eight universities, according to Jefferson Lab's memorial. In 2019 Jefferson Lab established the Hermann Grunder Postdoctoral Fellowship in Accelerator Science in recognition of his contributions to superconducting accelerator technology and the facility's development.
