= Fulvia Pilat =

Italian-American physicist

- Education: University of Trieste (Ph.D)
- Occupation: Physicist
- Organization(s): European Organization for Nuclear Research; Brookhaven National Laboratory; Thomas Jefferson National Accelerator Facility; Oak Ridge National Laboratory

Fulvia Pilat is an Italian-American physicist who is currently the Research Accelerator Division Director at the Spallation Neutron Source and an elected fellow of the American Physical Society (APS).

== Education and career ==
She earned her Ph.D from University of Trieste in 1986 before joining the European Organization for Nuclear Research (CERN) and later, in 1994, the Brookhaven National Laboratory followed by the Thomas Jefferson National Accelerator Facility in 2010 as Deputy Associate Director. In Nov. 2017, she accepted a new position at the Oak Ridge National Laboratory as the director of the Research Accelerator Division in the Neutron Sciences Directorate.

== Research ==
Her interests are the Continuous Electron Beam Accelerator Facility, for which she was elected to the APS for, and electron-ion colliders.

== Publications ==
- Design study for a staged very large hadron collider. Brookhaven National Laboratory. 2001.
- First polarized proton collisions at a beam energy of 250 GeV in RHIC. Proceedings of PAC09, Vancouver, BC, Canada. 2004.
- RHIC Magnet Transfer Functions. 1996.
- SXF (Standard eXchange Format): definition, syntax. Technical Report RHIC/AP/155, BNL. 1998.
