= Nordic House =

Nordic House may refer to:

- Nordic House (Iceland), designed by Finnish architect Alvar Aalto
- Nordic House in the Faroe Islands

== See also ==
- Pan Nordic Building
