= Dil =

Dil or DIL may refer to:

== Films ==
- Dil (1946 film), a Bollywood film
- Dil (1990 film), a Bollywood film
- Dil (1991 film), a Lollywood film
- Dil (2003 film), a Tollywood film

== Other uses ==
- Dil, Iran, a village in Iran
- DIL (musician), a British-Nigerian singer
- Daughter-in-law
- Debian-Installer Loader
- Deed in lieu
- Defence Industries Limited, a Canadian munitions company
- Dictionary of the Irish Language
- Drug-induced lupus erythematosus, an autoimmune disorder
- Dual in-line package, a type of package for electronic chips
- Presidente Nicolau Lobato International Airport, IATA code DIL

== See also ==
- DiI, a chemical compound
- Dill (disambiguation)
- Dyl (disambiguation)
