= SURAnet =

Early scientific computer network

SURAnet was a pioneer in scientific computer networks and one of the regional backbone computer networks that made up the National Science Foundation Network (NSFNET). Many later Internet communications standards and protocols were developed by SURAnet.

== How SURAnet started ==
The Southeastern Universities Research Association was created in December 1980 by scientists and university administrators throughout the southeastern United States, primarily led by the University of Virginia, the College of William & Mary, and the University of Maryland, College Park. The chief goal of SURA was the development of a particle accelerator for research in nuclear physics; this facility is now known as the Thomas Jefferson National Accelerator Facility. By the mid-1980s it was clear that access to high-capacity computer resources would be needed to facilitate collaboration among the SURA member institutions. A high-performance network to provide this access was essential, but no single institution could afford to develop such a system. SURA itself stepped up to the challenge and, with support from the U.S. National Science Foundation (NSF) and SURA universities, SURAnet was up and running in 1987, and was part of the first phase of National Science Foundation Network (NSFNET) funding as the agency built a network to facilitate scientific collaboration. SURAnet was one of the first and one of the largest Internet providers in the United States. SURA sites first used a 56 kbit/s backbone in 1987 which was upgraded to 1.5M bit/s (DS1) in 1989, and to a 45 Mbit/s (DS3) backbone in 1991. FIX East and MAE-East, both major peering points, were located at the main SURA facilities. Large-scale collaboration among SURA-affiliated scientists became an everyday reality.

== Role of SURAnet in the development of the Internet ==
SURAnet participated in the development of Internet communications standards and telecommunications protocols that enabled researchers and federal agencies to communicate and work in this early Internet environment. SURAnet was one of the first NSFNET regional networks to become operational. SURAnet provided networking services for universities and industry, and was one of the first TCP/IP networks to sell commercial connections, when IBM Research in Raleigh-Durham, North Carolina was connected in 1987–1988. It was also the first network to attempt to convert to OSPF in 1990.

== Beyond SURAnet ==
SURAnet was so successful that it outgrew SURA's primary mission, and the SURA Board approved its sale to Bolt, Beranek and Newman in 1995. Many of the protocols and procedures created under SURAnet are still in use in the commercial Internet today. SURA continues to be a force in the information technology community, participating in projects such as the Extreme Science and Engineering Discovery Environment (XSEDE), Earthcube, and AtlanticWave.
