= Dill (surname) =

Dill is a German and English surname. Notable people with the surname include:

- Augustus Granville Dill (1882–1956), American sociologist, educator and musician
- Bob Dill (1920–1991), American professional ice hockey player
- Clarence Dill (1884–1978), American politician
- Craig Dill (born 1944), American basketball player
- Cynthia Dill (born 1965), American lawyer and politician
- Danny Dill (1924–2008), American country music singer
- Dean Dill (died 2015), American magician
- Diana Douglas (1923–2015), née Dill, Bermudian-American actress
- Eric Dill (born 1981), American singer and songwriter
- Jacob William Dill, (1840–1920) Canadian merchant and political figure
- James Dill (1859–1937), Canadian politician
- John Dill (1881–1944), UK Second World War field marshal
- Larry Dill (born 1963), Canadian former professional soccer player
- Lesley Dill (born 1950), American contemporary artist
- Ludwig Dill (1848–1940), German ship and landscape painter
- Matan Dil (born 1982), Israeli politician
- Max Dill (1876–1949), American vaudeville comedian
- Nathalia Dill (born 1986), Brazilian actress
- Roger Dill (born 1957), Bermudan international cricket umpire
- Samuel Marcus Dill (1843–1924), Presbyterian minister
- Terry Lee Dill, American sculptor

== Fictional characters ==
- Grover Dill, a character in the 1983 American movie A Christmas Story

== See also ==
- Dill
