= Sean Hearne =

American physicist

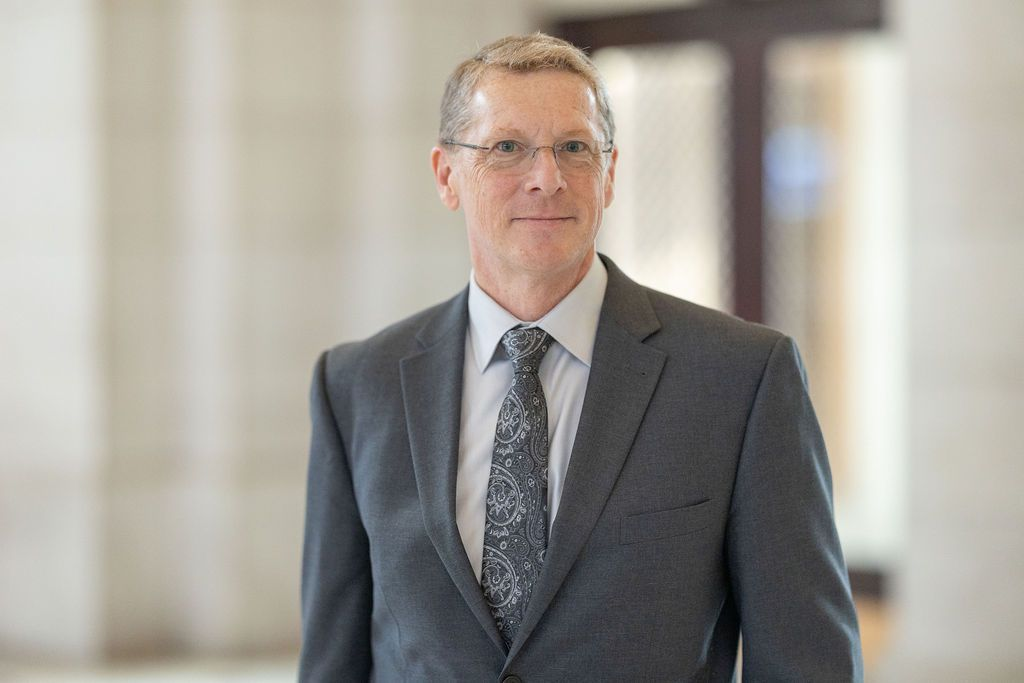
- Sean Hearne, December 2023, Union Station, Washington DC
- Education: Embry–Riddle Aeronautical University (BS); Arizona State University (MS); Arizona State University (PhD)
- Known for: Materials science; Science leadership
- Scientific career
- Fields: Physics / Materials Science
- Workplaces: Southeastern Universities Research Association; Oak Ridge National Laboratory; Sandia National Laboratories
- Thesis: Stress creation and relaxation during thin film deposition (2000)
- Doctoral advisor: Ignatius Tsong

Sean Hearne is an American physicist, materials scientist and research executive, who is the president and CEO of the Southeastern Universities Research Association (SURA) and chairman of the SURATech board, the managing and operating company of Jefferson Laboratory. His career has included scientific and management positions at Intel Corporation, Sandia National Laboratories and Oak Ridge National Laboratory. Hearne served as the 43rd president of the Materials Research Society. He was elected a Fellow of the American Physical Society in 2020 and a Fellow of the American Association for the Advancement of Science in 2024.

== Education ==
Hearne received his B.S. in Aviation Technology from Embry-Riddle Aeronautical University, and his M.S. and Ph.D. in Solid State Physics from Arizona State University.

== Career ==
Hearne spent 18 years as a scientist and manager at Sandia National Laboratories in Albuquerque, New Mexico, where he rose to be the co-director of the Center for Integrated Nanotechnologies. In 2019, joined Oak Ridge National Laboratory as the director of first the Center for Nanophase Materials Sciences and then the director of the Materials Science and Technology Division (MSTD). In 2022, Hearne became the president and CEO of the Southeastern Universities Research Association (SURA).

Hearne also sat on numerous boards and review committees, including Princeton University's External Advisory Council for the Princeton Materials Institute and Georgia Tech's advisory board for SENIC, a National Science Foundation user facility.

In July 2026, Hearne was named “individually and in his full capacity” as one of four defendants in a wrongful termination lawsuit alleging gender discrimination filed by plaintiff, Dr. Cynthia E. Keppel, whose position as Associate Director for Physics at the Thomas Jefferson National Accelerator Facility was terminated in November 2025. The lawsuit alleges, “Hearne participated in and approved the discriminatory treatment of Dr. Keppel, the decision to terminate her employment, and the post-termination retaliatory conduct. Hearne is sued individually and in his official capacity as President and CEO of SURA.”

== Research ==
Hearne’s research has included thin-film stress, electrodeposition, semiconductor materials, micro- and nanofabrication, III–V semiconductors and energy-storage technologies. His most frequently cited work concerns the development and relaxation of stress in polycrystalline thin films.

He is a co-author of the 2002 Physical Review Letters article “Origin of Compressive Residual Stress in Polycrystalline Thin Films.” Hearne is also an inventor on United States patents related to materials science and semiconductor processing.

== Professional service and honors ==
Hearne served as president of the Materials Research Society and has participated in scientific advisory boards and review committees. These have included the Princeton Materials Institute External Advisory Council, the Georgia Tech Southeastern Nanotechnology Infrastructure Corridor Advisory Board, and advisory bodies associated with Arizona State University and the Singapore Economic Development Board.

In 2020, Hearne was elected a Fellow of the American Physical Society. In 2024, he was elected a Fellow of the American Association for the Advancement of Science for contributions to leadership and mentoring in energy and nanoscience research and education.

== Other Interests ==
Hearne's interests included amateur auto racing. He raced both Spec Miata with SCCA and vintage Formula Ford and traveled around the US racing as part of the Daniel's Racing team, led by New Mexico Supreme Court Justice Charles W. Daniels.
