= GlueX =

Ongoing American particle physics experiment

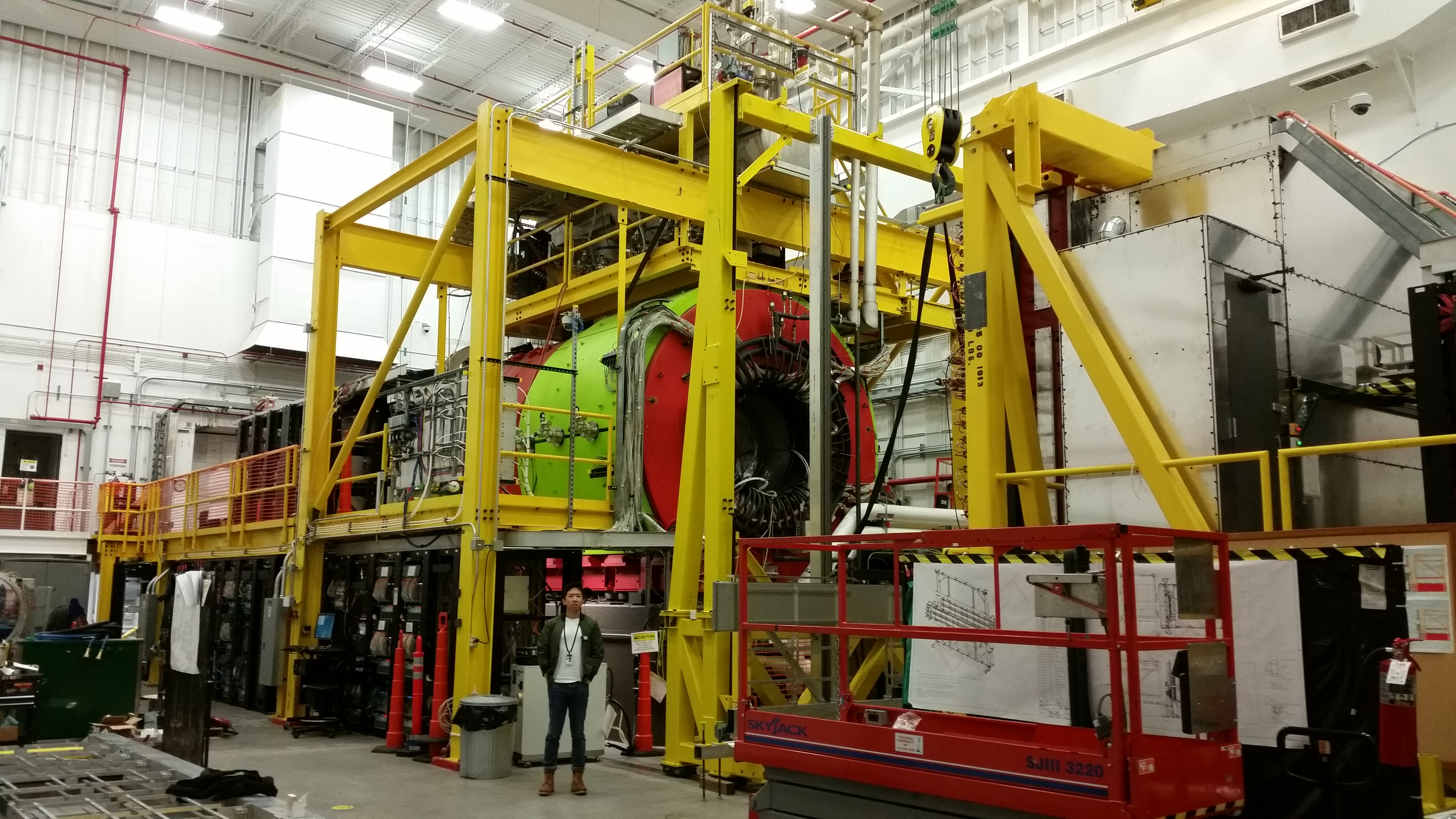
Fig. 1: The GlueX Spectrometer in Hall D at Jefferson Lab, viewed from the downstream side, in October 2017

GlueX is a particle physics experiment located at the Thomas Jefferson National Accelerator Facility (JLab) accelerator in Newport News, Virginia. Its primary purpose is to better understand the nature of confinement in quantum chromodynamics (QCD) by identifying a spectrum of hybrid and exotic mesons generated by the excitation of the gluonic field binding the quarks. Such mesonic states are predicted to exist outside of the well-established quark model, but none have been definitively identified by previous experiments. A broad high-statistics survey of known light mesons up to and including the J/ψ is also underway.

== Experimental apparatus ==
The experiment uses photoproduction (that is, the scattering of a real photon on a nucleon) to produce mesonic states. Unlike previous similar experiments, it uses linearly polarized photons, which allows the analysis of accumulated events for certain polarization observables that are thought to make identification of exotic states feasible.

The GlueX detector was installed in the new Hall D (the fourth such hall at JLab) as part of the accelerator's upgrade to a particle energy of 12 GeV. GlueX began its first commissioning run in 2014, and first received electrons at 12 GeV electrons in 2015, the highest energy available at the CEBAF accelerator. Publication-quality physics data was accumulated during multi-weeks runs starting in 2016, continuing into 2023 and beyond.

The detector is based on a solenoidal hermetic detector optimized for tracking of charged particles (electron, pions, kaons, and protons) and detection of neutral particles (primarily photons). Figure 1 shows the detector.

GlueX uses the coherent bremsstrahlung technique to produce a linearly polarized photon beam. In order to reach the optimal photon energy near 9 GeV for this mapping of the exotic spectrum, electrons at 12 GeV are required and are provided by the CEBAF accelerator at Jefferson Lab.

Since 2019, improved kaon–pion separation capability was established with the addition of a quartz-based differential Cherenkov light detector ("DIRC").

== Program ==
The goal of the GlueX experiment is to search for and study hybrid mesons. Hybrid mesons, and in particular exotic hybrid mesons, provide the ideal laboratory for testing QCD in the confinement regime since these mesons explicitly manifest the gluonic degrees of freedom. Photoproduction is expected to be particularly effective in producing and identifying these states. At the same time these data will be used to study the spectrum of conventional mesons, including the poorly understood excited vector mesons and strangeonium.

The search for new mesonic states requires very specialized analysis methods since such states are rare and must be established through their decay to lighter and longer-lived particles. By examining the energy and angular distributions of produced particles through partial wave analysis, the production and decay of all intermediate states can be reconstructed. The quantum numbers of the intermediate states can be established by this method. These quantum numbers include the spin angular momentum (J), parity (P), and charge conjugation parity (C). Many hybrid states are expected to have quantum number combinations that are the same as conventional quark-model mesons. But the quark model predicts precisely how many such states should exist, and it is expected that an "overpopulation" of certain combinations may herald hybrid states. That is, identified intermediate states with quantum numbers permitted by the quark model may be "hybrids" that contain gluonic excitation, and can be established as such if their number and pattern of mass distribution are not explained within the simple quark model. States with quantum numbers that are strictly forbidden by the naive quark model are said to be "exotic" and, if found experimentally, immediately demonstrate gluonic excitation.

A list of the scientific and technical papers resulting from the GlueX program is linked at the bottom of this article. The range of questions addressed is broad, as seen in the following list of topics of present and possible future runs:

- Exploration of the light meson spectrum
- Partial wave decomposition of various reaction channels to identify underlying mesonic structure
- Threshold photoproduction of charm and the search for associated pentaquarks
- High-statistics study of eta and eta-prime meson production, asymmetries, and decays
- Photoproduction of baryon–antibaryon pairs
- Search for photoproduced cascade resonances beyond the few well-known ones
- Search for "leptophobic" states beyond the Standard Model
- Eta meson decay width measurement via the Primakoff effect
- Measurement of the polarizability of pions, as a test of low-energy QCD

== Collaborating institutions ==
Cumulative since 2003.

=== Universities ===
- Arizona State University – Tempe, AZ
- Carnegie Mellon University – Pittsburgh, PA
- Catholic University of America – Washington, DC
- Christopher Newport University – Newport News, VA
- Florida International University – Miami, FL
- Florida State University – Tallahassee, FL
- George Washington University – Washington, DC
- Indiana University – Bloomington, IN
- Massachusetts Institute of Technology – Cambridge, MA
- Norfolk State University – Norfolk, VA
- North Carolina A&T State – Greensboro, NC
- Northwestern University – Chicago, IL
- Old Dominion University – Norfolk, VA
- Rensselaer Polytechnic Institute – Troy, NY
- The College of William and Mary – Williamsburg, VA
- Tomsk State University – Tomsk, Russia
- Universidad Técnica Federico Santa María – Valparaíso, Chile
- University of Athens – Athens, Greece
- University of Connecticut – Storrs, CT
- University of Glasgow – Glasgow, Scotland
- University of North Carolina – Wilmington, NC
- University of Massachusetts – Amherst, MA
- University of Regina – Regina, Canada
- University of Virginia – Charlottesville, VA
- Wuhan University – Wuhan, China
- Washington & Jefferson College – Washington, PA

=== Laboratories ===
- Budker Institute of Nuclear Physics – Novosibirsk, Russia
- GSI Helmholtz Centre for Heavy Ion Research – Darmstadt, Germany
- Institute for High Energy Physics – Protvino, Russia
- Institute of High Energy Physics (IHEP) – Beijing, China
- Nuclear Physics Institute, Moscow State University – Moscow, Russia
- Thomas Jefferson National Accelerator Facility – Newport News, VA
- Yerevan Physics Institute – Yerevan, Armenia

== See also ==
- Exotic meson
- Glueball
- Gluon
