= Dyl =

Dyl or DYL may refer to:

== People ==
- Dyl Harris (1926–1988), Welsh rugby league footballer
- Les Dyl (1952–2022), English rugby league footballer

== Places ==
- DYL, the IATA code of Doylestown Airport, Pennsylvania

== Other ==
- DYL Motorcycles
- Dylan (name)
