= Dill Creek =

Stream in New York, U.S.

Coordinates: 42°46′8.28″N 73°20′23.40″W

Dill Creek is a stream in the U.S. state of New York.

It is speculated by the University of the State of New York that the stream may have been named for dill plant along its course, or after a local family with the surname Dill.
