= Dill Building =

- U.S. National Register of Historic Places
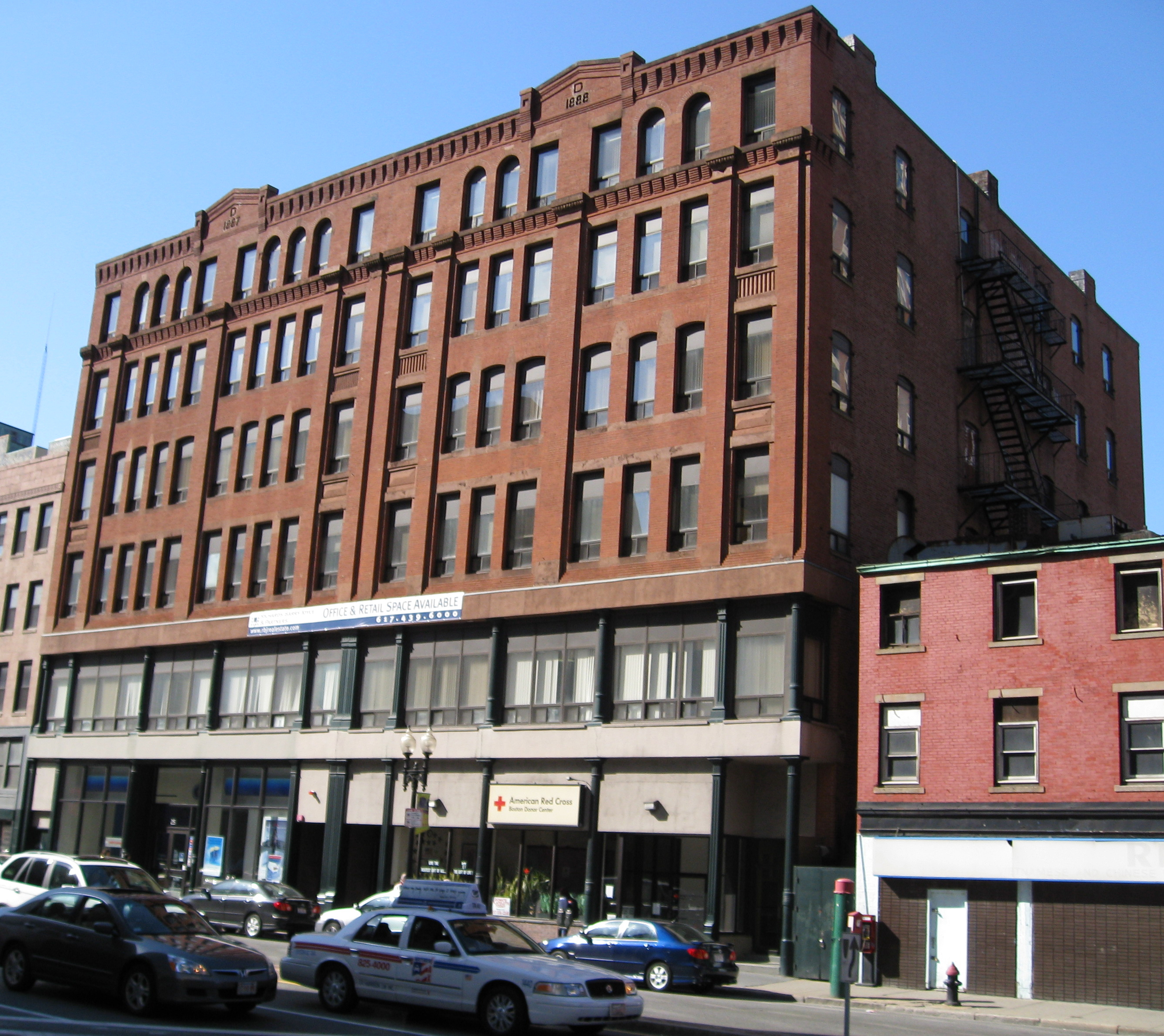
- Dill Building, Boston, in April 2008

- Location within Boston Location within Massachusetts Location within the United States
- Location: Boston, Massachusetts
- Coordinates: 42°21′04.0″N 71°03′48.5″W
- Built: 1886
- Architect: A.S. Drisko
- MPS: Boston Theatre MRA
- NRHP reference No.: 80000448
- Added to NRHP: December 9, 1980

The Dill Building is an historic building at 11–25 Stuart Street in Boston, Massachusetts.

The six story brick building was constructed in two phases between 1886 and 1888. Its facade is symmetrical, each half of floors 3–5 organized into window groups separated by brick pilasters. There is a corbelled cornice line between floors 5 and 6, with the window pattern continued on the sixth floor without pilasters. The main roof line is also corbelled, with two stepped parapet sections inscribed with the construction dates. The building was listed on the National Register of Historic Places in 1980.

Previous tenants in the building include the American Red Cross, M & M Realty Trust, Smith Barney and Citibank. In 2012, Hostelling International opened a 468 hostel (HI-Boston) after a complete renovation of the building. After more than a year of construction, the completed building encompasses 55,000 sq ft over 6 floors. The renovation preserves and exposes historical features of the building.
