= Southeastern Universities Research Association =

Consortium of universities

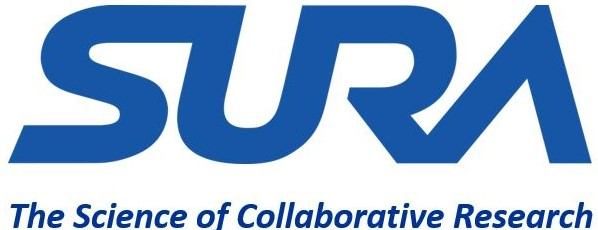
- Type: Nonprofit organization
- Headquarters: 1201 New York Ave. NW, Suite 430, Washington, D.C. 20005
- Location: United States, Canada
- Members: 57
- President & CEO: Sean Hearne
- Website: sura.org

The Southeastern Universities Research Association, Inc. (SURA) is a non-profit association with member universities from the United States and Canada. SURA is focused on advancing science, research, and educational discovery.

SURA, in partnership with the Virginia Polytechnic Institute and State University, co-owns SURATech, LLC, the Management and Operating (M&O) contractor for Thomas Jefferson National Accelerator Facility in Newport News, Virginia. In addition to managing Jefferson Lab, SURA supports research and workforce development across space sciences, computational and data sciences, and nuclear physics.

SURA was founded in May 1980 at a meeting at The College of William & Mary, in which a group of research physicists from various universities recognized the opportunity to create a consortium to promote the expansion of nuclear physics in southeastern United States. Harry Holmgren of the University of Maryland, was the first elected president of SURA, with Jim McCarthy from the University of Virginia as the Vice President. SURA was initially formed in response to the science community’s desire to build an electron accelerator to explore the role of quarks in nuclear structure. Originally named CEBAF, the laboratory is now known as the Thomas Jefferson National Accelerator Facility (Jefferson Lab).

== Organization ==
As a consortium of 57 advanced research institutions, SURA collaborates with its members to support the Department of Energy, the National Science Foundation (NSF), the National Aeronautics and Space Administration (NASA), and the Department of Defense in addition to other federal and commercial industry research and development programs.

SURA currently partners with NASA on the Center for Research and Exploration in Space Science and Technology (CRESST) II program and the Goddard Earth Science Technology and Research (GESTAR) II program.

== SURAnet ==
The goal of SURA was the development of a particle accelerator for research in nuclear physics; this facility is now known as the Thomas Jefferson National Accelerator Facility. By the mid-1980s it was clear that access to high-capacity computer resources would be needed to facilitate collaboration among the SURA member institutions. A high-performance network to provide this access was essential, but no single institution could afford to develop such a system. SURA itself stepped up to the challenge and, with support from the U.S. National Science Foundation (NSF) and SURA universities, “SURAnet” was up and running in 1987, and was part of the first phase of National Science Foundation Network (NSFNET) funding as the agency built a network to facilitate scientific collaboration.

== Member institutions ==
Member Institutions:

- Arizona State University
- University of Alabama
- University of Alabama at Birmingham
- University of Alabama in Huntsville
- University of Arkansas
- Auburn University
- Catholic University of America
- University of Central Florida
- Christopher Newport University
- Clemson University
- University of Delaware
- Duke University
- University of Florida
- Florida Atlantic University
- Florida Institute of Technology
- Florida International University
- Florida State University
- George Mason University
- George Washington University
- Georgetown University
- University of Georgia
- Georgia Institute of Technology
- Georgia State University
- Hampton University
- Indiana University
- James Madison University
- University of Louisiana at Lafayette
- Louisiana State University
- University of Maryland, College Park
- University of Maryland, Baltimore County
- Massachusetts Institute of Technology
- University of Miami
- Mississippi State University
- Norfolk State University
- University of North Carolina at Chapel Hill
- North Carolina State University
- University of Oklahoma
- Old Dominion University
- Purdue University
- University of Regina
- Rice University
- University of Richmond
- University of South Carolina
- University of South Florida
- University of Southern Mississippi
- University of Tennessee
- Temple University
- Texas A&M University
- Tulane University
- Vanderbilt University
- University of Virginia
- Virginia Commonwealth University
- Virginia Polytechnic Institute and State University
- Virginia State University
- West Virginia University
- College of William & Mary

Affiliate Members:

- Idaho State University
- Ohio University
