= Matan Dil =

Israeli politician

- מתן דיל
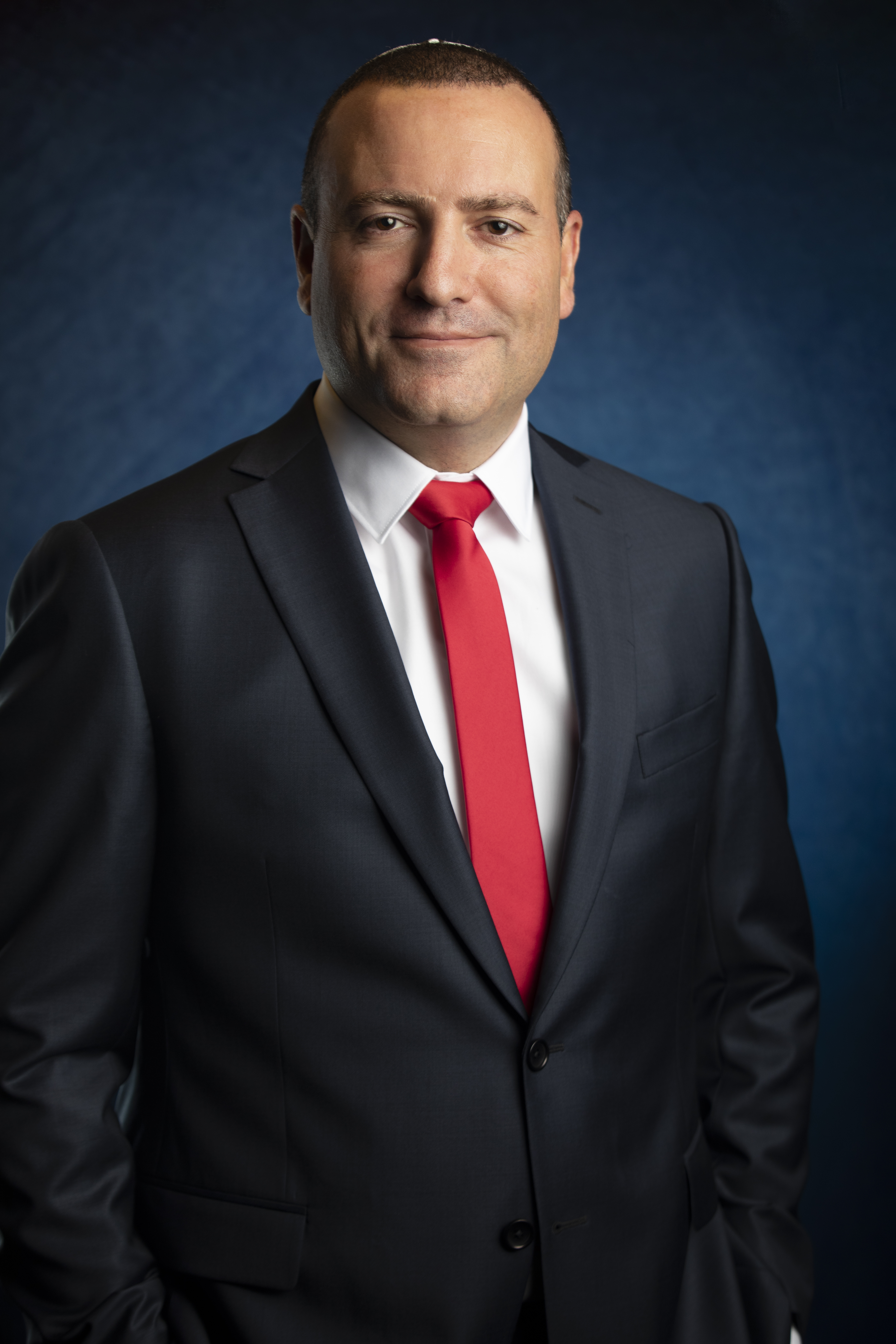
- Matan Dil, 2023

Personal details
- Born: 27 June 1982 (age 43) Rehovot, Israel

Matan Dil (Hebrew: מתן דיל; born 27 June 1982) is the mayor of Rehovot, Israel.

== Biography ==
Matan, son of Yoram Dil was born in Rehovot on 27 June 1982.

holds a bachelor's degree in law from the College of Management Academic Studies and a master's degree in Government and Public Administration from the Interdisciplinary Center Herzliya.

In 2013 he was elected to the city council of Rehovot, heading a new list called "Rehovoti". Following the municipal elections of 2018 he became the head of the opposition in the city council. In 2024 he was elected as mayor.
