= Dill (restaurant) =

Restaurant in Iceland

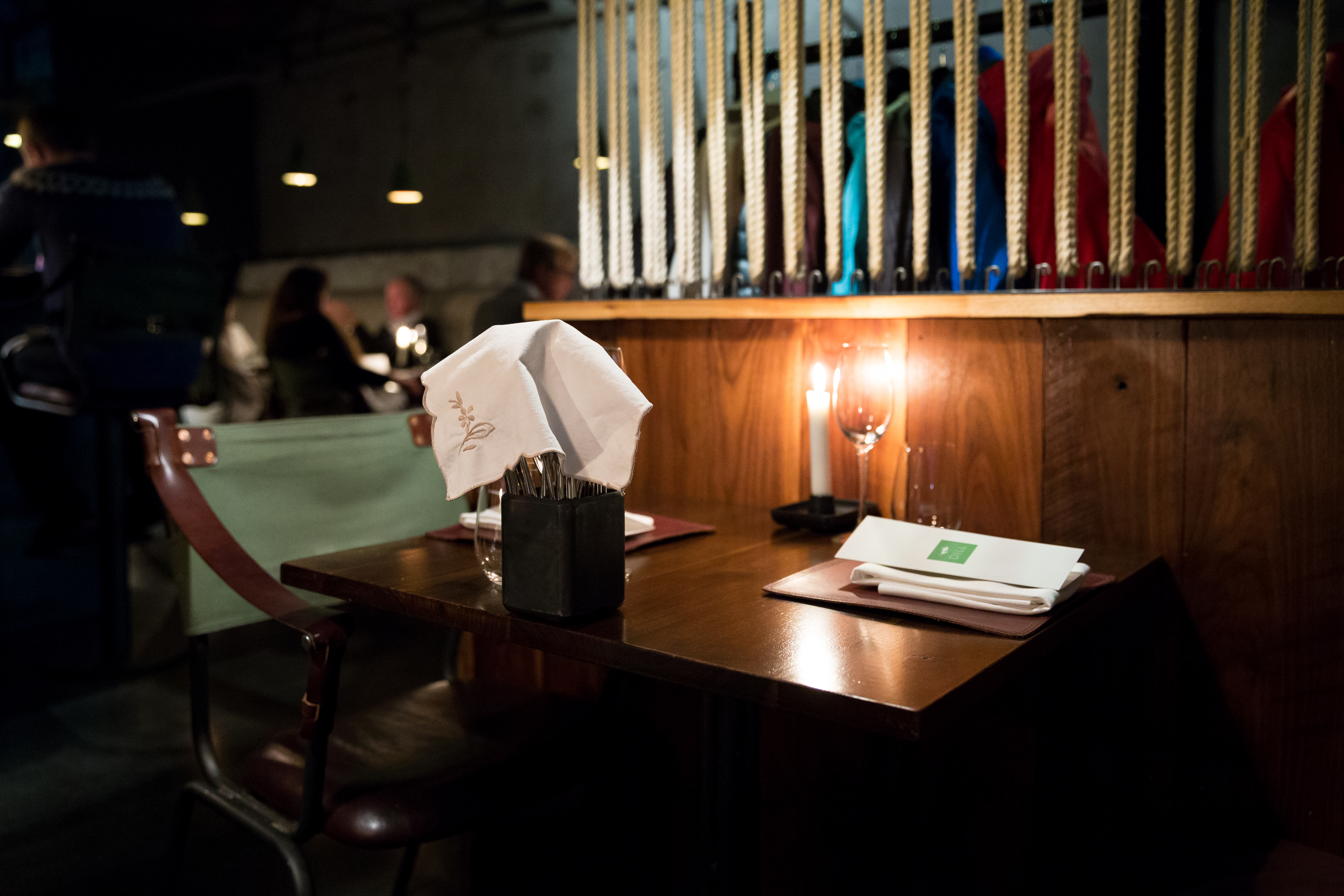
- Interactive map of Dill

Restaurant information
- Established: 2009
- Owner: Gunnar Karl Gíslason
- Head chef: Gunnar Karl Gíslason
- Food type: New Nordic
- Rating: Michelin Guide
- Location: Laugavegur 59, Reykjavík, Iceland
- Coordinates: 64°08′40.3″N 21°55′21.0″W
- Website: www.dillrestaurant.is

Dill is a New Nordic restaurant in Reykjavík, opened in 2009. It was the first restaurant in Iceland to be awarded a Michelin star, in 2017.

== History ==
Dill opened in 2009, shortly after the economic crash of 2008. Investors pulled out and chef Gunnar Karl Gíslason, for whom it was the first independent venture, made up the shortfall using his credit cards. It was located in the Nordic House in Reykjavík, a modernist building designed by the Finnish architect Alvar Aalto, and was named for the herb dill, which plays a major role in Scandinavian cuisine.

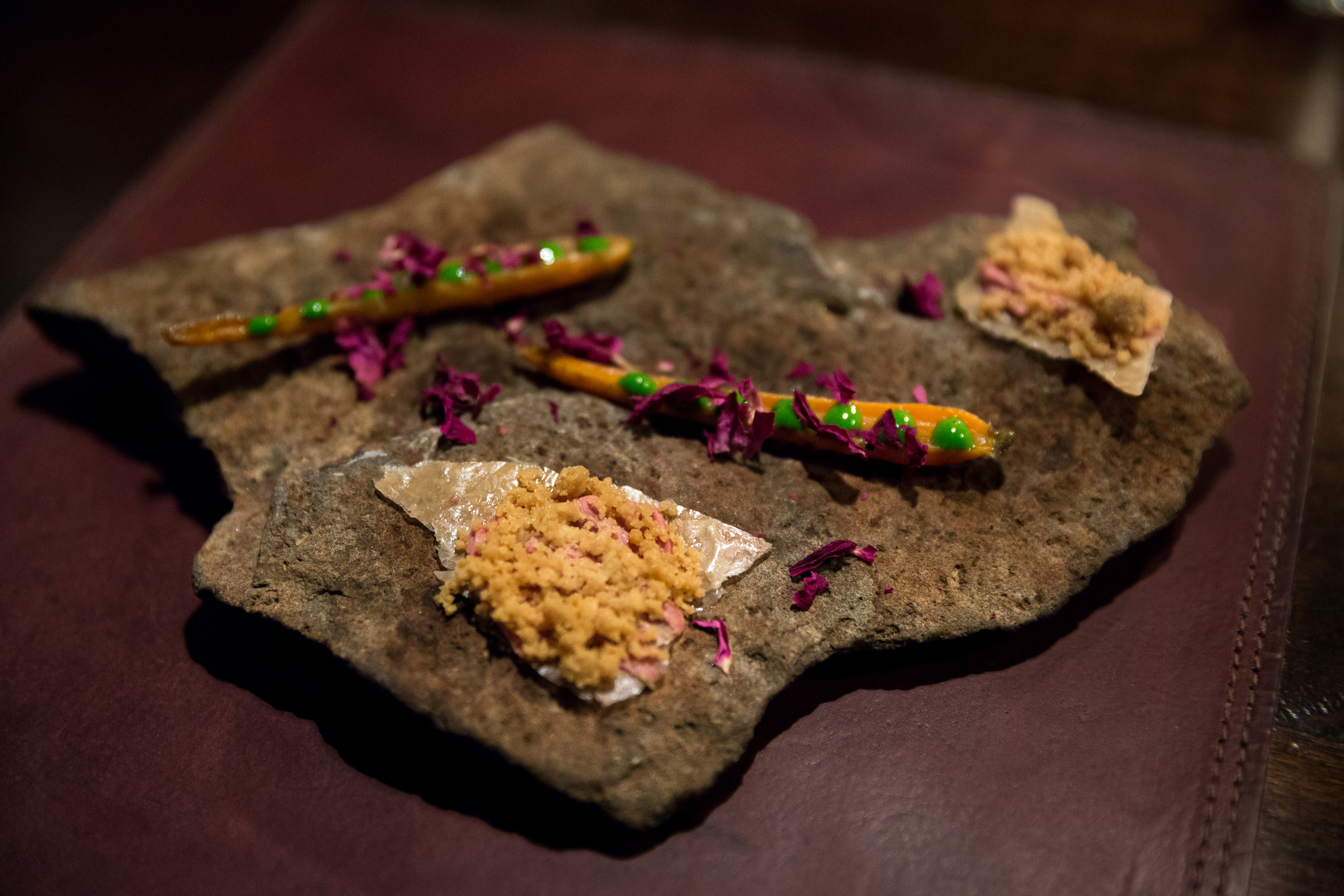
A dish at the restaurant

Gunnar Karl was one of the first proponents of New Nordic cuisine in Iceland; he gathered herbs and vegetables both in a kitchen garden and in a greenhouse, and although the restaurant is not vegetarian, focussed his dishes on them rather than on meat or fish, which he did not always include. He sourced barley from Eymundur Magnússon, a farmer who runs a company called Módir Jörð (Mother Earth) with his wife, and blue mussels from Simon Sturluson, a fisherman in Stykkishólmur who credits him with creating the restaurant market for them. The restaurant also makes extensive use of smoked and dried ingredients. In 2016 a restaurant review highlighted the dried puffin and trout smoked in the traditional Icelandic manner over straw impregnated with sheep excreta.

The restaurant moved in 2015 to the centre of Reykjavík, where in 2016 a reporter for the Boston Globe described it as "evoking a fisherman's cottage retrofitted in a medieval church", with natural stone walls, a ceiling of wooden slats, and low lighting.

== Awards ==
Dill has been named best restaurant in Iceland by White Guide Nordic and the Nordic Prize. At its new location, the interior designed by Hálfdán Pedersen was nominated for the 2015 Restaurant & Bar Design Awards. In February 2017, it was awarded the first Michelin star given to an Icelandic restaurant; it lost the star in February 2019. Dill reclaimed its Michelin star in February 2020.

== See also ==
- List of Michelin-starred restaurants in Iceland
