= Jens Dilling =

German physicist

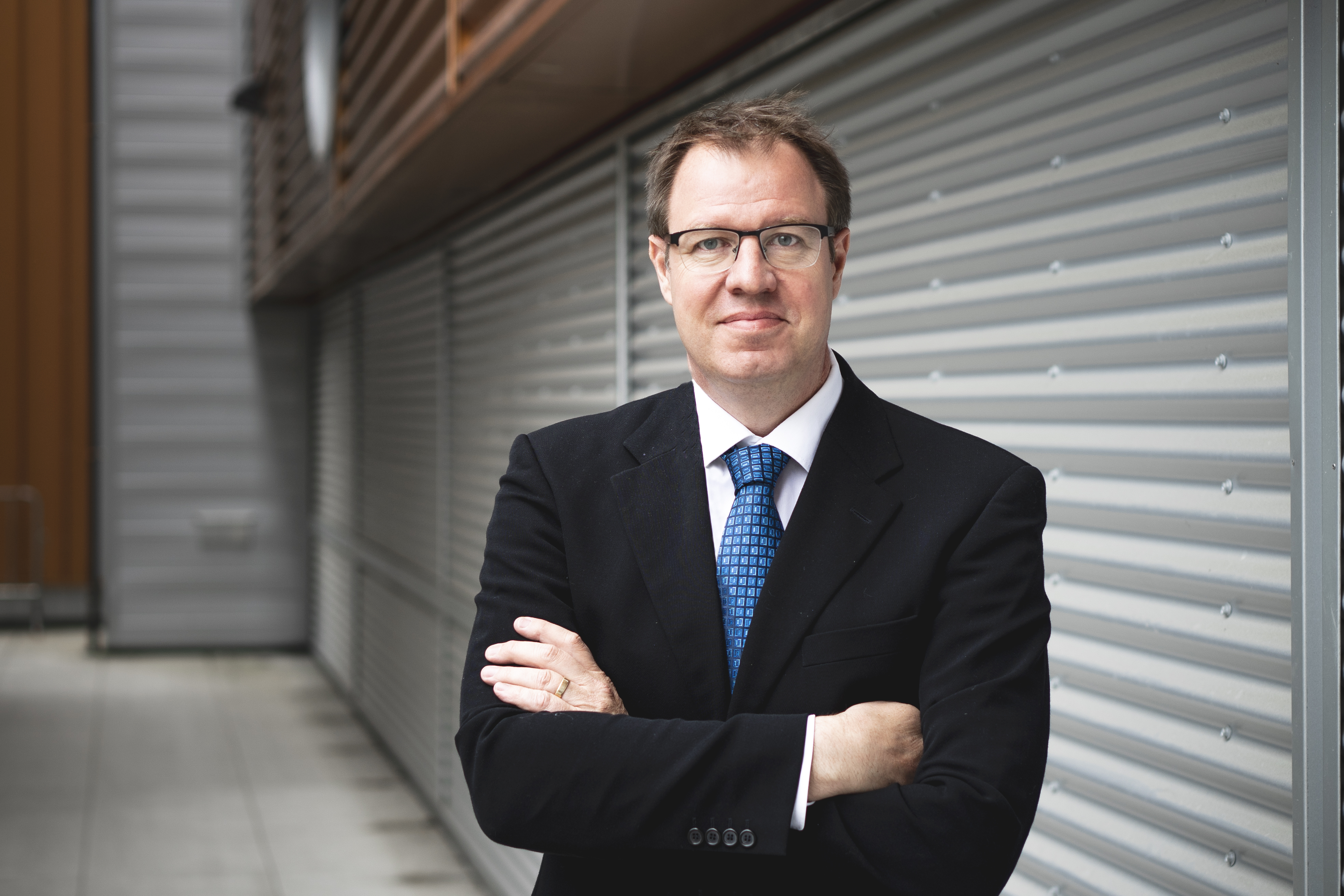
Jens Dilling in 2018

Jens Dilling is an experimental nuclear physicist and currently the Laboratory Director of the U.S. Department of Energy's Thomas Jefferson National Accelerator Facility director since 30 June 2025.

== Life ==
=== Education ===
Jens Dilling obtained both his undergraduate and doctorate degrees in physics from the University of Heidelberg in Germany. During his graduate studies, he did research at the GSI Helmholtz Centre for Heavy Ion Research and the ISOLDE Radioactive Ion Beam Facility at CERN.

=== Career ===
Dilling began his career at TRIUMF in 2001, as an experimental nuclear physicist, eventually becoming associate laboratory director of physical sciences, where he was in charge of experimental and theoretical nuclear and particle physics, molecular and material science, scientific instrumentation, and scientific computing. His research focuses on characterizing the strong force using precise mass measurements, in particular investigating atomic physics techniques applied to nuclear physics using particle accelerators. He proposed, co-designed, and led the construction of the TRIUMF Ion Trap for Atomic and Nuclear Science (TITAN). Dilling served as a member and secretary on the IUPAP Commission on Symbols, Units, Nomenclature, Atomic Masses and Fundamental Constants (C2) from 2005 to 2011. In 2021, he became director of institutional strategic planning at Oak Ridge National Laboratory (ORNL), where he oversees the development of laboratory strategies, strategic investments, and annual planning. In 2023, he was appointed as the Associate Laboratory Director for Neutron Sciences at ORNL, overseeing the scientific and operation portfolio of the High Flux Isotope Reactor (HFIR) and the Spallation Neutron Source (SNS). He is a member of the German Physical Society, Canadian Association of Physicists, and American Physical Society.

In July 2026, Dilling was named “individually and in his full capacity” as one of four defendants in a wrongful termination lawsuit alleging gender discrimination filed by plaintiff, Dr. Cynthia E. Keppel, whose position as Associate Director for Physics at the Thomas Jefferson National Accelerator Facility was terminated in November 2025. The lawsuit alleges, “Dilling is the primary perpetrator of gender discrimination, hostile work environment, retaliatory conduct, and post-termination defamatory statements described herein. Dilling is sued individually and in his official capacity as Laboratory Director.”

== Publications ==
His most cited publications according to Google Scholar are:

- Herfurth, F; Dilling, J; Kellerbauer, A; Bollen, G; Henry, S; Kluge, H.-J; Lamour, E; Lunney, D; Moore, R.B; Scheidenberger, C; Schwarz, S; Sikler, G; Szerypo, J (2001). "A linear radiofrequency ion trap for accumulation, bunching, and emittance improvement of radioactive ion beams". Nuclear Instruments and Methods in Physics Research Section A: Accelerators, Spectrometers, Detectors and Associated Equipment. 469 (2): 254–275. arXiv:nucl-ex/0011021. Bibcode:2001NIMPA.469..254H. doi:10.1016/s0168-9002(01)00168-1. ISSN 0168-9002. S2CID 14155609.
- Sánchez, R.; Nörtershäuser, W.; Ewald, G.; Albers, D.; Behr, J.; Bricault, P.; Bushaw, B. A.; Dax, A.; Dilling, J.; Dombsky, M.; Drake, G. W. F.; Götte, S.; Kirchner, R.; Kluge, H.-J.; Kühl, Th.; Lassen, J.; Levy, C. D. P.; Pearson, M. R.; Prime, E. J.; Ryjkov, V.; Wojtaszek, A.; Yan, Z.-C.; Zimmermann, C. (25 January 2006). "Nuclear Charge Radii ofLi9,11: The Influence of Halo Neutrons". Physical Review Letters. 96 (3) 033002. American Physical Society (APS). arXiv:physics/0509265. doi:10.1103/physrevlett.96.033002. ISSN 0031-9007. PMID 16486695. S2CID 45223132.
- Blaum, Klaus; Dilling, Jens; Nörtershäuser, Wilfried (1 January 2013). "Precision atomic physics techniques for nuclear physics with radioactive beams". Physica Scripta. T152 014017. IOP Publishing. arXiv:1210.4045. Bibcode:2013PhST..152a4017B. doi:10.1088/0031-8949/2013/t152/014017. ISSN 0031-8949. S2CID 119203410.

=== Awards ===
In 2012, Dilling was named a fellow of the American Physical Society. Dilling was awarded the Canadian Association of Physicists CAP-Vogt Award in 2013. In 2015, he was awarded the GENCO Scientific Achievement Award (membership award) of the GSI Helmholtz Centre and the European Exotic Nuclei Community. In 2017, Dilling was awarded the Francis M. Pipkin Award "for technical contributions and the use of Penning traps for the precise measurement of short-lived, radioactive nuclei such as halo nuclei and highly charged ions". Dilling received the Rutherford Memorial Medal of the Royal Society of Canada for "breakthrough discoveries in the field of experimental nuclear physics studying the fine details of the interactions of the atomic building blocks, the nucleons," in 2020.
