= Walter J. Dilling =

Scottish pharmacologist and physiologist (1886–1950)

Walter James Dilling
- Born: 15 May 1886; Aberdeen, Scotland
- Died: 18 August 1950 (aged 64); Coniston, England
- Education: University of Aberdeen
- Children: Eva M. Dilling
- Scientific career
- Fields: Pharmacology, physiology

Walter James Dilling (15 May 1886 – 18 August 1950) was a Scottish pharmacologist and physiologist.

== Life ==
His father was William Dilling. Dilling was married and had children.

=== Scientific career ===
In 1907 Dilling gained the M.B. (Hons.), and he was a Phillips Scholar. Walter James Dilling, who has been Lecturer in Pharmacology in the University since 1910, has been appointed to the Dr. Robert Pollok Lectureship in Materia Medica and Pharmacology in Glasgow University. Dr. Dilling, after graduating, was for a year junior assistant in physiology. He then proceeded to Germany as Carnegie Scholar and Fellow, and studied and taught at the University of Rostock under Dr. Rudolf Robert, one of the outstanding authorities in the science of pharmacology, becoming second and then first assistant in the Rostock Institute for Pharmacology and Physiological Chemistry. He has conducted research in several directions, and has made various contributions on pharmacological and allied subjects to the scientific and medical press. He is the author of several important articles in the "Encyclopaedia of Pharmacology and Treatment," and edited the last (ninth) edition of Dr. Mitchell Bruce's" Materia Medica and Therapeutics". He has, besides, interested himself in medical history and contributed articles to Dr. Hastings's "Encyclopaedia of Religion and Ethics".

=== Military life ===
From 1903 to 1905, he was a Private and R.A.M.C. (Volunteers). In February 1916, he was Lieutenant and R.A.M.C. (Territorial). Dilling provided his home service for 3 years. His final rank was the rank Captain.

== Literature ==
- University of Aberdeen, ed. (November 1914). The Aberdeen University Review (PDF). Vol. 2. Aberdeen: The Aberdeen University Press. p. 74.
