= CLAS detector =

US nuclear and particle physics detector

CEBAF Large Acceptance Spectrometer (CLAS) is a nuclear and particle physics detector located in the experimental Hall B at Jefferson Laboratory in Newport News, Virginia, United States. It is used to study the properties of the nuclear matter by the collaboration of over 200 physicists (CLAS Collaboration) from many countries all around the world.

The 0.5 to 12.0 GeV electron beam from the accelerator of Jefferson Laboratory is brought into "Hall B", the experimental hall that houses the CLAS system. Electrons or photons in the incoming beam collide with the nuclei of atoms in the physics "target" located at the center of CLAS. These collisions generally produce new particles, often after the target nucleons (protons and neutrons) are briefly excited to heavier-mass versions of the familiar protons and neutrons. A whole variety of intermediate-mass short-lived particles called "mesons" can be created. Scattered electron as well as the longer-lived produced particles travel through the CLAS detector, where they are measured. Particle physicists use these measurements to deduce the underlying structure of protons and neutrons and to better understand the interactions that create these new particles.

The CLAS detector system was operational from 1998 until May 2012. From that time onward, analysis of archived data continued for some years, as can be traced in the publications. Since 2012, a similar but new system called CLAS12 was constructed, which began operations with particle beams in 2017.

== Overview of Detector Function ==
The CLAS detector was notable among devices in the area of hadronic particle physics in that it had a very large acceptance; in other words, it measured the momentum and angles of almost all of the particles produced in the electron-proton collisions. Roughly spherical, the detector measured 30 feet across. It surrounded the physics target, which was typically a small cylinder of liquid hydrogen (hydrogen's nucleus is composed of a single proton) or deuterium (with a nucleus consisting of a neutron and a proton).

Each particle-target collision is called an "event". An elaborate data acquisition system records each event measured by the particle detectors, up to several thousand events per second on average. This data is then transferred to a "farm" of computing processors. Teams of physicists analyze the events, looking for new kinds of particles or information related to the underlying structure of the proton.

== Detector Description ==
A diagram of the CLAS detector is shown in the Figure, as well as a photograph of the detector when it was partially pulled open for maintenance. The physics target is at the center. Charged particles are detected in almost all directions, excluding the very forward (beam) and backward (beam) directions, and also excluding azimuthal directions occupied by six toroidal magnetic field coils. The detector was designed in a nested form, with successive layers of particle detectors to either track particle paths or record particle flight-times. The toroidal magnet field causes charged particle from the target to bend in arcs either toward or away from the beam line. Particles leaving the target first pass through a timing counter to register the beginning of their trajectories. The particles then traverse three packages of drift chambers which are used to track their paths though the magnetic field, and thereby allow determination of their momentum.

Outside the magnetic field, a layer of timing detectors measure the time of passage of the particles at a distance of about four meters from the target. Dividing the path length of a particle track by the time of travel gives the speed. Knowing the momentum and speed of a particle leads to its identification via its mass. The CLAS detector also contains additional detectors in the forward direction (Cherenkov counters and Electromagnetic Calorimeters) whose purpose is to distinguish electrons from other types of particles such as pions.

== Physics Program ==
Two categories of experiments were carried out with CLAS: using electrons in the beam and using so-called real photons created using the electron beam. Experiments using electron scattering primarily probe the structure of protons and their excitations at various sub-nuclear "length scales". Experiments using real photon beams primarily probe the production and decay of mesons and excited baryons.

A list of the scientific and technical papers resulting from the CLAS program is linked at the bottom of this article. The range of questions addressed is broad, as seen in the following list of topics given in no particular order:

- Inelastic electron scattering on the nucleon to study the creation and decay of nucleon excited states
- Hyperon photo- and electro-production, exploring the spectrum of ground state and excited strange baryons
- Meson photoproduction off the nucleon, searching for mesonic states not accounted for in the quark model
- Electro-disintegration of nuclear targets to study the correlations among nucleons within the nucleus
- Deep-inelastic electron scattering with meson production using polarized beam and/or target to study the full 3D distribution of quarks inside the nucleon

== Collaborating Institutions (Cumulative since 1989) ==
- Arizona State University - Tempe, AZ
- California State University - Dominguez Hills, CA
- Carnegie Mellon University - Pittsburgh, PA
- Catholic University of America - Washington, DC
- CEA-Saclay - Gif-sur-Yvette, France
- Christopher Newport University, Newport News, VA
- Florida International University - Miami, FL
- Florida State University - Tallahassee, FL
- George Washington University - Washington, DC
- Idaho State University - Pocatello, ID
- INFN, Laboratori Nazionali di Frascati - Frascati, Italy
- INFN, Sezione di Genova - Genova, Italy
- Institut de Physique Nucléaire - Orsay, France
- ITEP - Moscow, Russia
- James Madison University - Harrisonburg, VA
- Kyungpook University - Daegu, South Korea
- Massachusetts Institute of Technology - Cambridge, MA
- Moscow State University - Moscow, Russia
- Mississippi State University - Mississippi State, MS
- Norfolk State University - Norfolk, VA
- North Carolina Agricultural and Technical State University - Greensboro, NC
- Ohio University - Athens, OH
- Old Dominion University - Norfolk, VA
- Rensselaer Polytechnic Institute - Troy, NY
- Rice University - Houston, TX
- The College of William and Mary - Williamsburg, VA
- Thomas Jefferson National Accelerator Facility - Newport News, VA
- Union College - Schenectady, NY
- Universidad Técnica Federico Santa María - Valparaíso, Chile
- University of California Los Angeles - Los Angeles, CA
- University of Connecticut - Storrs, CT
- University of Edinburgh - Edinburgh, Scotland
- University of Glasgow - Glasgow, Scotland
- University of Massachusetts - Amherst, MA
- University of New Hampshire - Durham, NH
- Université Paris-Sud 11 - Orsay, France
- University of Richmond - Richmond, VA
- University of South Carolina - Columbia, SC
- University of Virginia - Charlottesville, VA
- Virginia Polytechnic Institute - Blacksburg, VA
- Yerevan Physics Institute - Yerevan, Armenia

== Similar Facilities World Wide ==
- Mainz Microtron
- LEPS
- HERA
- HERMES

== List of Publications ==
- The CEBAF large acceptance spectrometer (CLAS) technical description
- A list of CLAS publications from INSPIRE-HEP
- A list of CLAS publications from the JLab Hall B website
