= Nordic House (Iceland) =

Icelandic cultural institution

Coordinates: 64.1381°N 21.9469°W

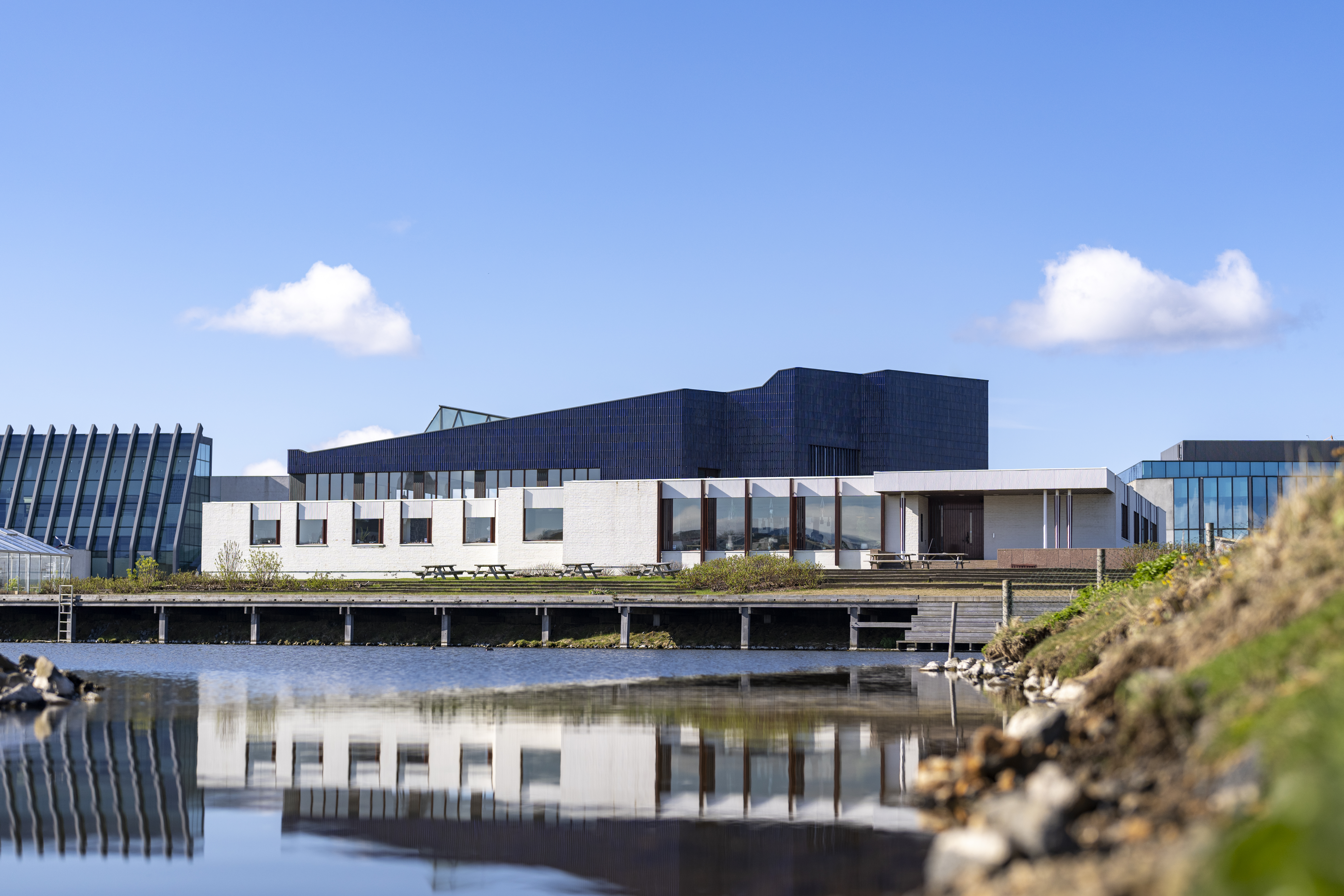
The Nordic House Reykjavík

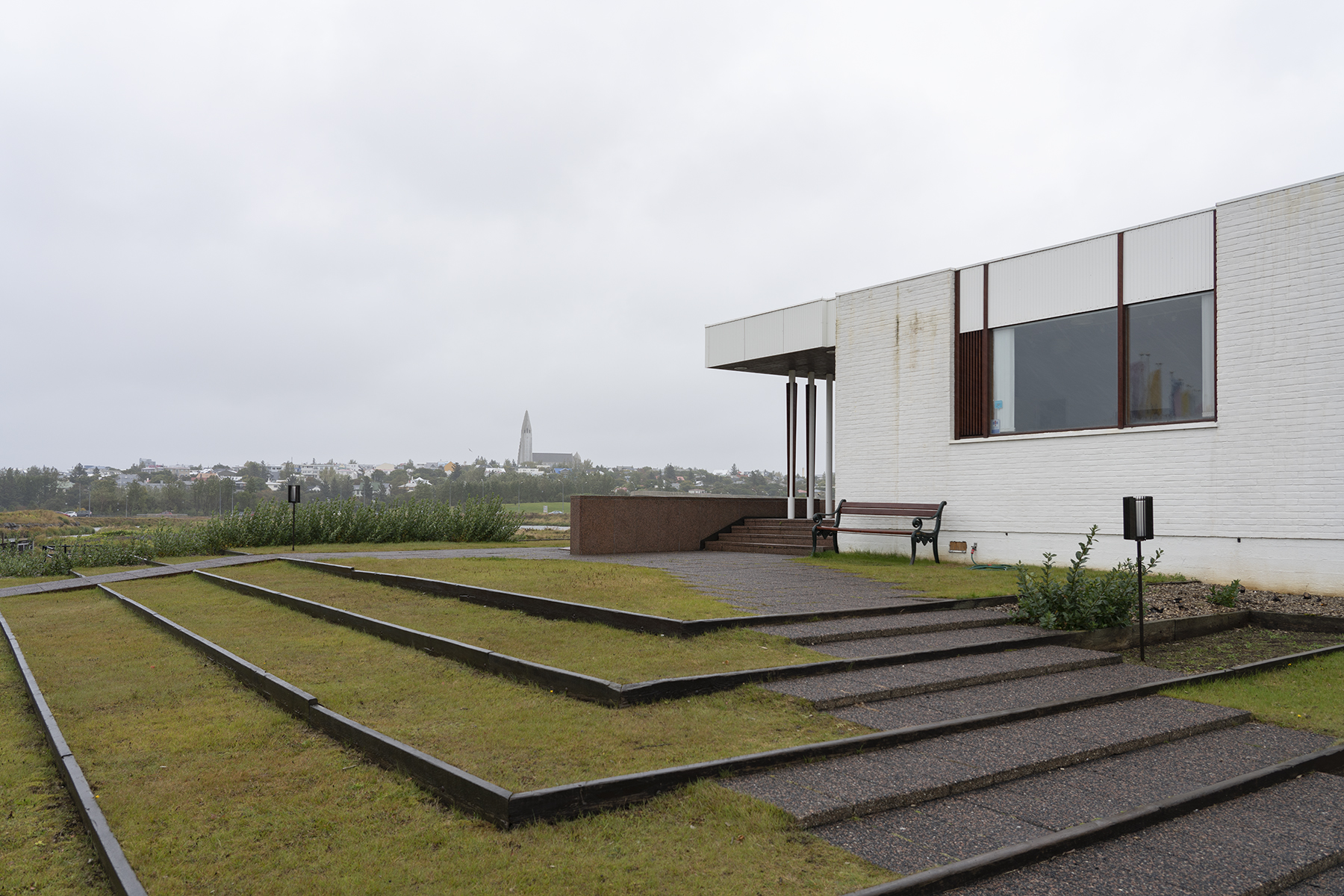
Entrance terrace

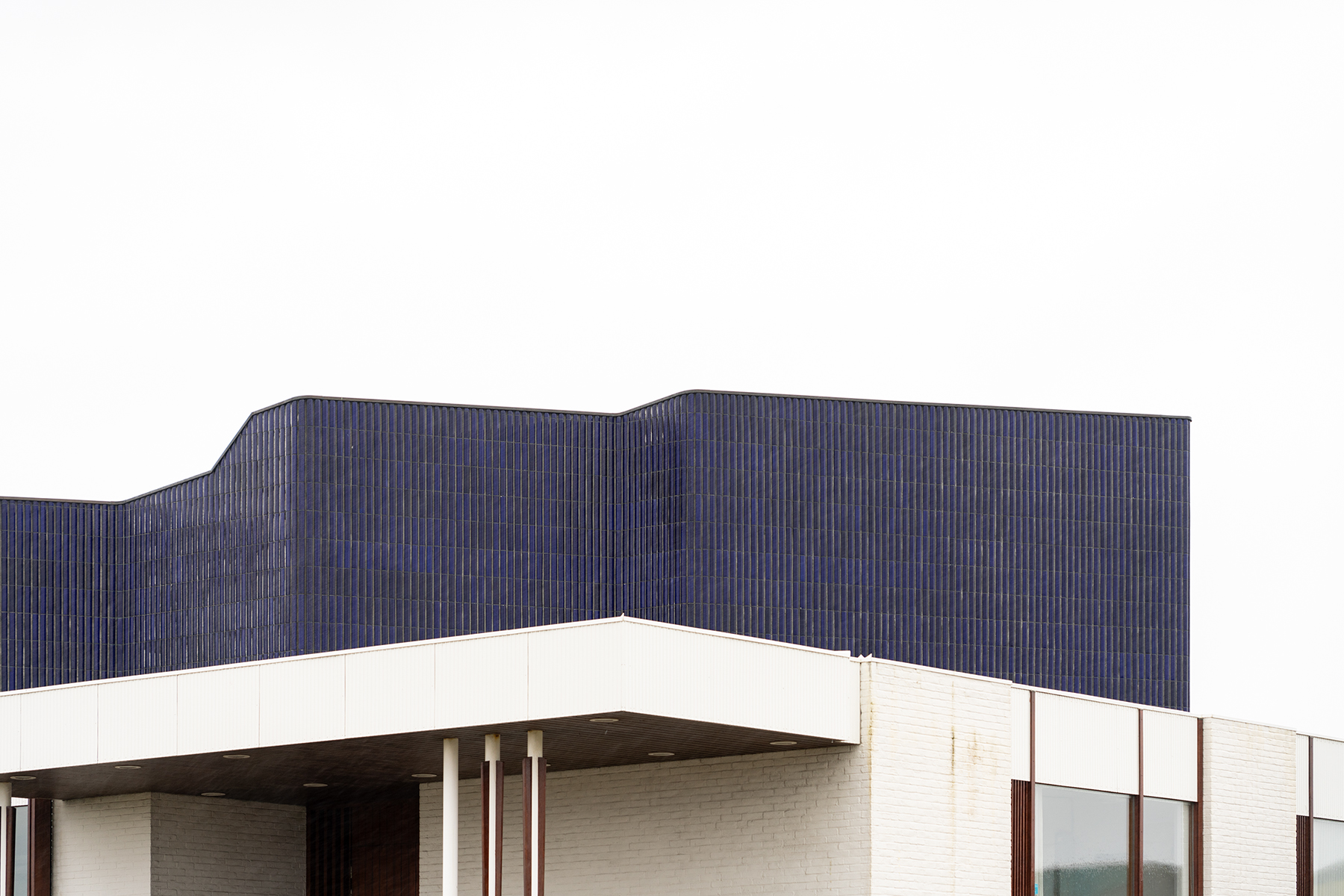
Blue iceberg roof

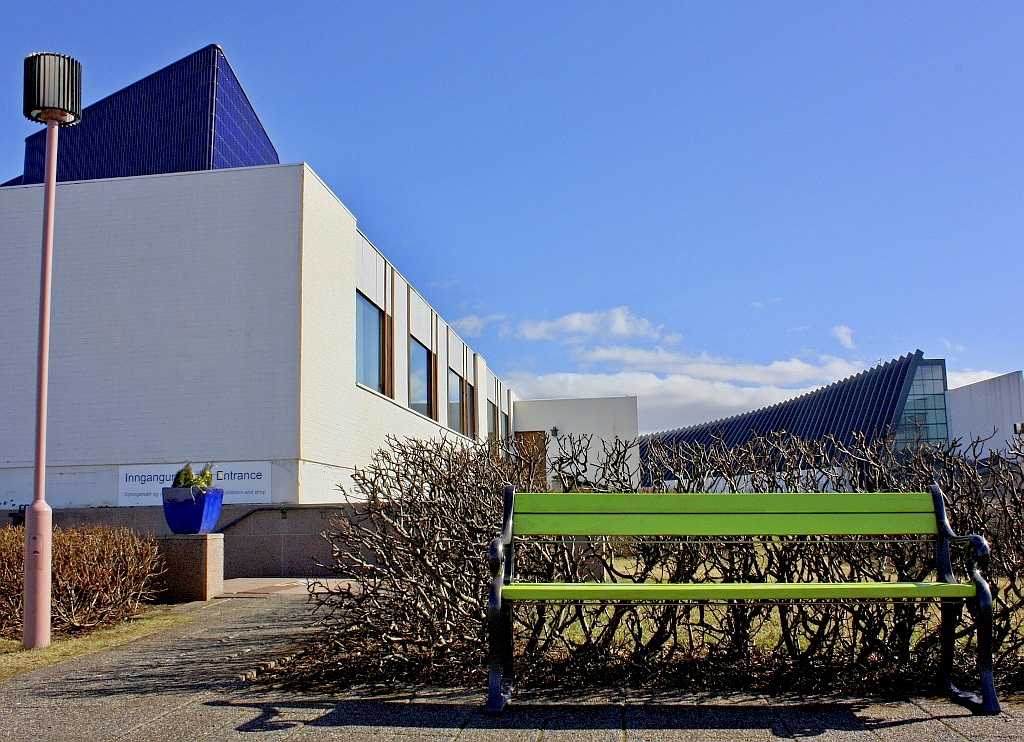
The Nordic House

The Nordic House (Icelandic: Norræna húsið [ˈnɔrˌraiːna ˈhuːsɪθ]) in Reykjavík is a cultural institution opened in 1968 and operated by the Nordic Council of Ministers. Its goal is to foster and support cultural connections between Iceland and the other Nordic countries. To this end the Nordic House organises a diverse program of cultural events, exhibitions, seminars and activities & courses for children. It is the venue for several events in the Icelandic cultural calendar: the Reykjavík International Film and Literary Festivals, Iceland Airwaves and Design March.

The Nordic House maintains a library that is unique in Iceland because of its architecture and design by Alvar Aalto and its collection of over 30,000 items in seven Nordic languages, though not including Icelandic. Library users may loan books, eBooks, films, magazines and graphic art by Nordic artists from the Artotek, study or have a cup of coffee.

The Nordic House has an exhibition space (Hvelfing), auditoriums and a children's library. Dill Restaurant was also originally located there; the current restaurant is SÓNÓ, which serves fresh, vegetarian food.

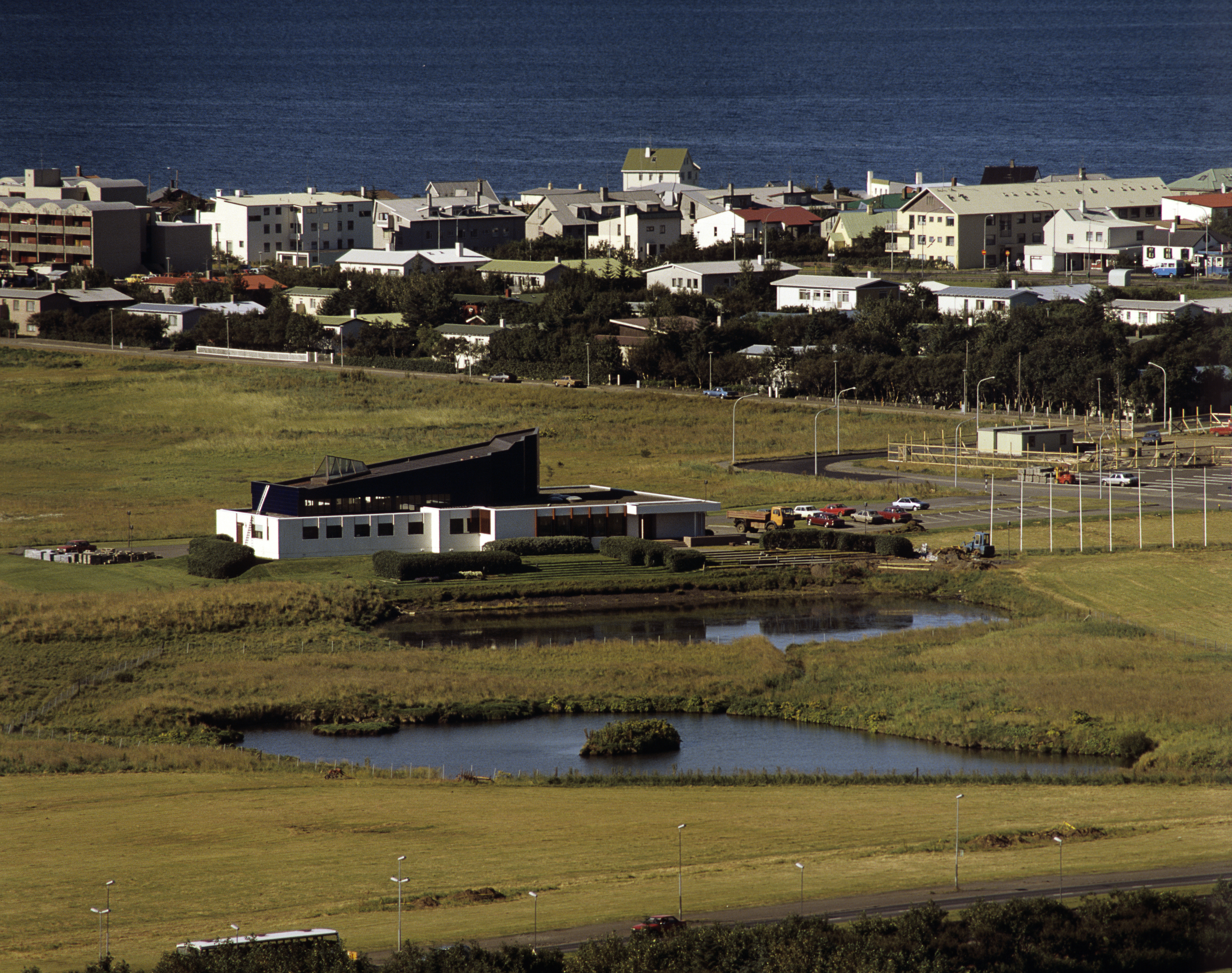
The Nordic House and surroundings

The Nordic House was designed by the Finnish modernist architect Alvar Aalto. One of his later works, it features most of Aalto's signature traits: for example, the organic shape of the ridgeline of the ultramarine-tiled roof, echoing the range of mountains in the distance; the central well in the library; and the extensive use of white, tile and wood throughout the building. Aalto also designed most of the furnishings in most of his buildings. In the Nordic House, all installed furnishings, lamps and almost all of the furniture are by Aalto. The construction of the building was overseen and managed by Elissa Aalto who in close collaboration with the project architect Ilona Lehtinen, also completed the drawings for the construction.

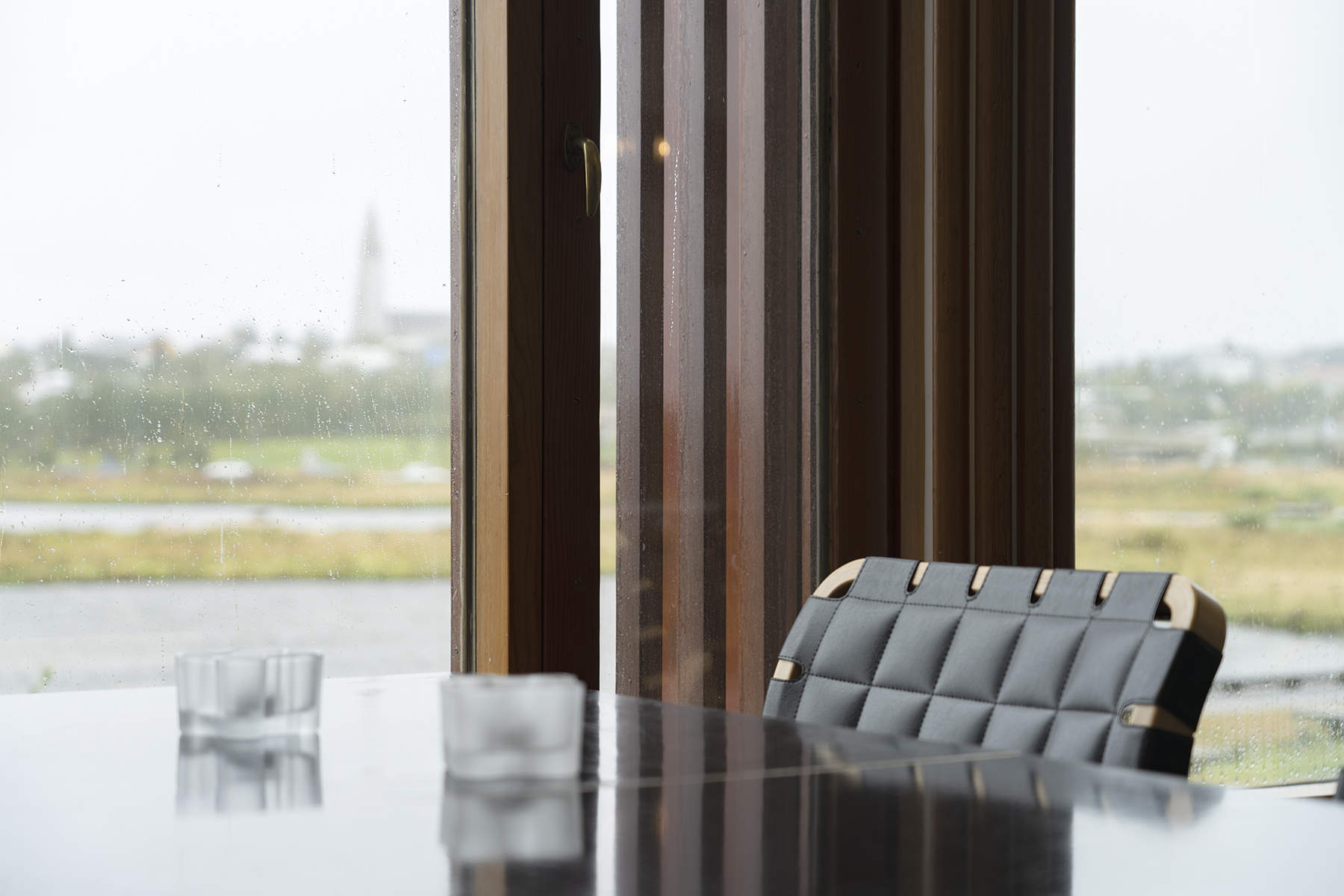
Interior view from Cafe

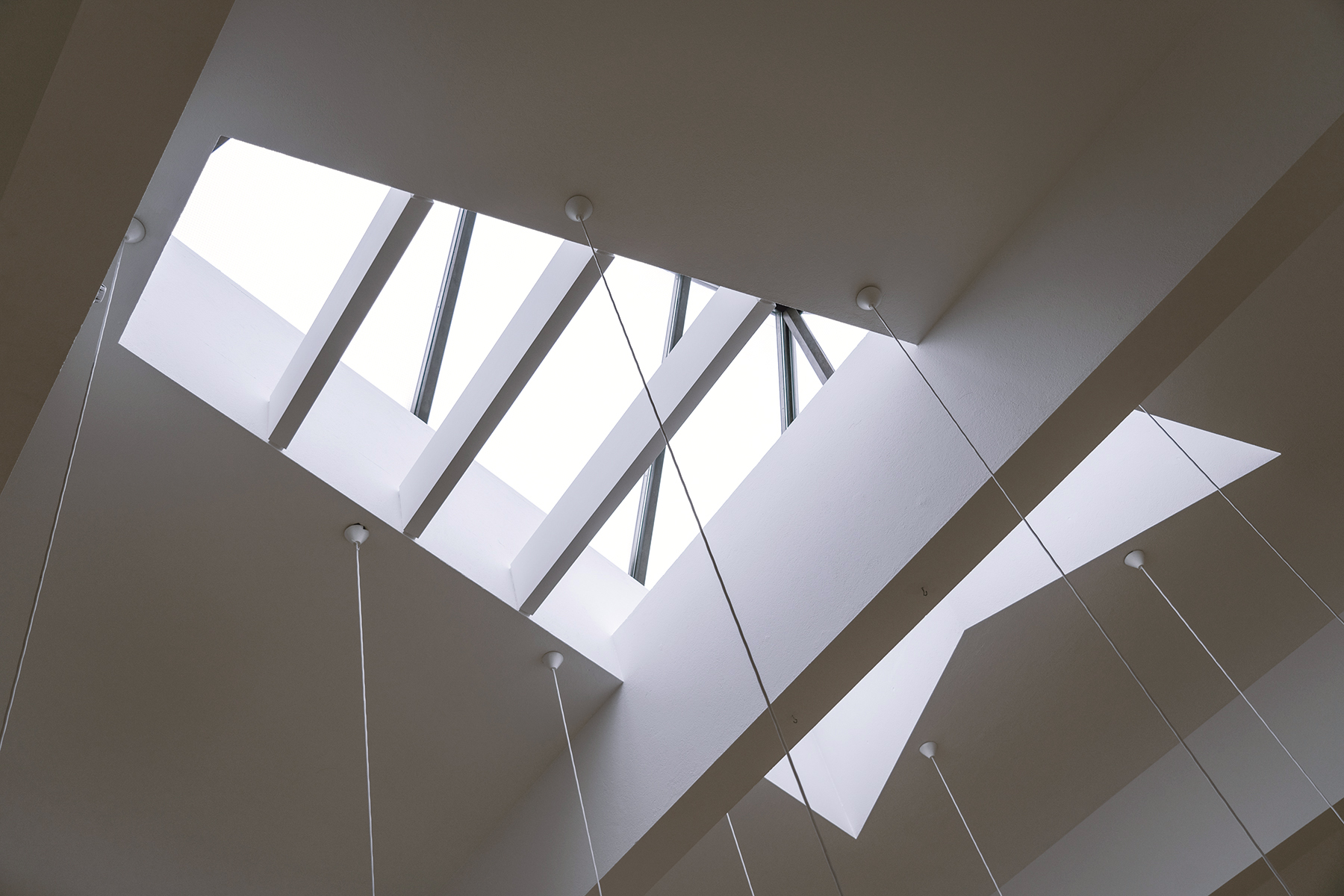
Library Skylight

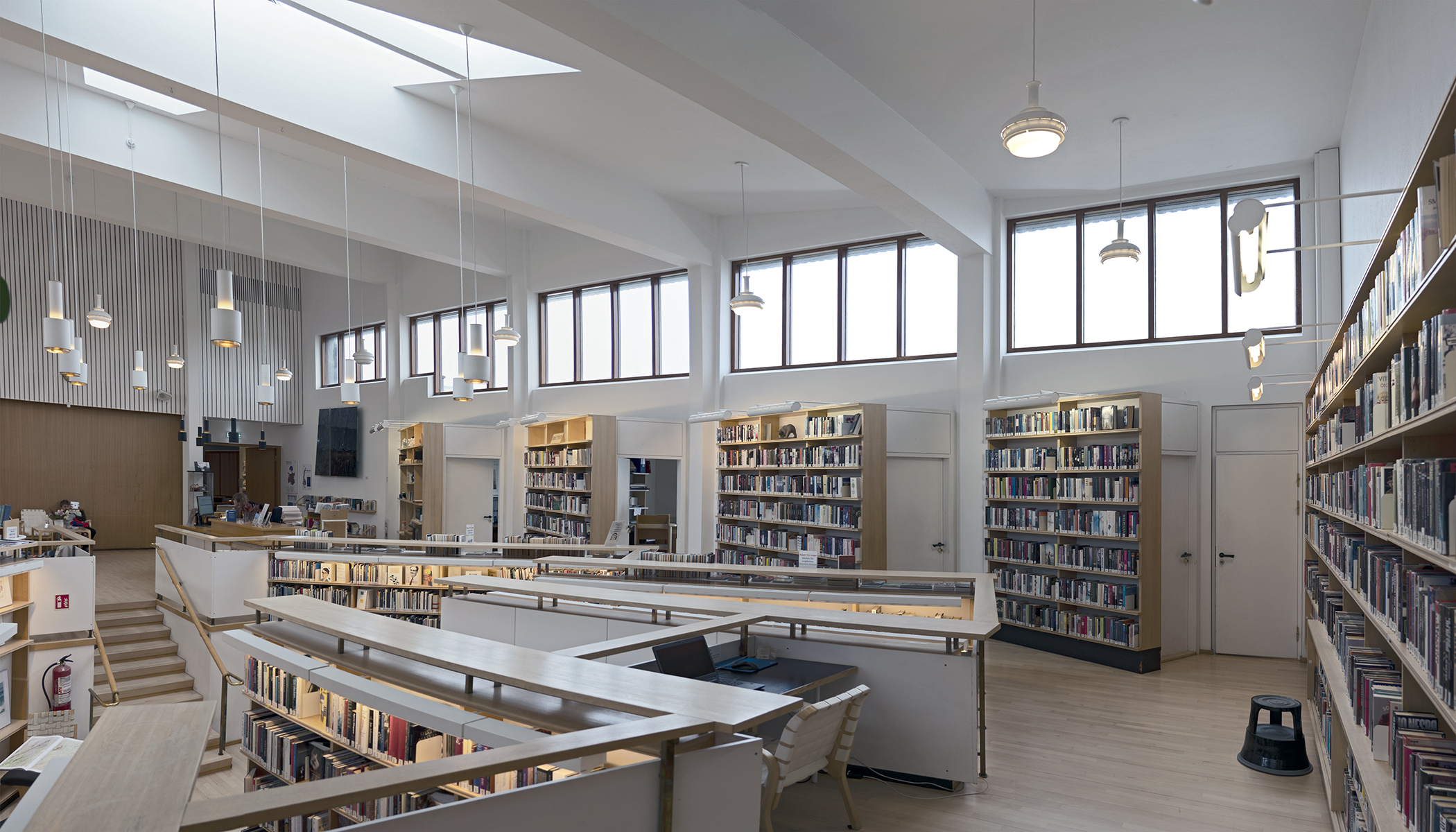
View within Library

The current Director is Sabina Westerholm.

== See also ==
- Nordic House (Faroe Islands)
