= Jefferson Lab =

Particle accelerator laboratory in Newport News, Virginia, USA

Thomas Jefferson National Accelerator Facility
- Motto: Exploring the nature of matter
- Established: 1984; 42 years ago
- Research type: Nuclear physics
- Budget: c. US$200 million (2010)
- Director: Jens Dilling
- Staff: 675
- Location: Newport News, Virginia, United States
- Campus: 214 acres (87 ha)
- Affiliations: United States Department of Energy
- Operating agency: SURATech, LLC
- Website: www.jlab.org www.suratech.org

Continuous Electron Beam Accelerator Facility (CEBAF)
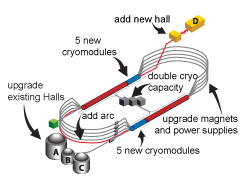
- Schematic of the accelerator and the experimental halls after the 12 GeV energy upgrade.

General properties
- Accelerator type: Paired linacs
- Beam type: electrons
- Target type: fixed target

Beam properties
- Maximum energy: 12 GeV
- Maximum current: 85 µA

Physical properties
- Length: 1400 meters (7/8-mile) per linac
- Coordinates: 37°05′41″N 76°28′54″W
- Institution: Jefferson Science Associates, LLC
- Dates of operation: 1984–present

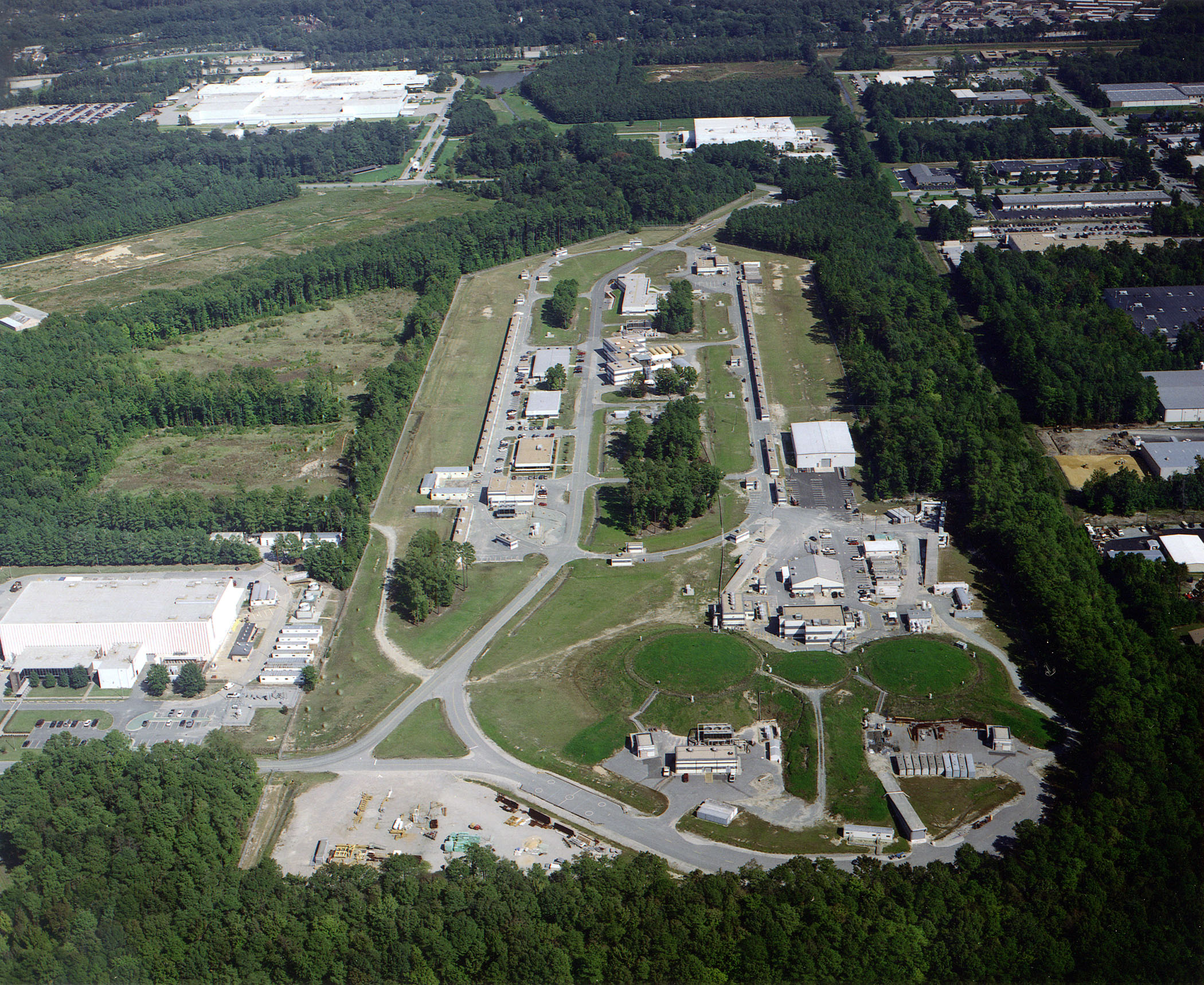
Aerial view of Jefferson Lab

The Thomas Jefferson National Accelerator Facility (TJNAF), or JLab for short, is a US Department of Energy National Laboratory located in Newport News, Virginia.

Since June 1, 2026 the facility has been operated by SURATech, LLC. The SURATech, LLC team is composed of two team member entities – Southeastern Universities Research Association, Inc. and Virginia Polytechnic Institute and State University, and four major subcontractors – Honeywell International, Inc., Longenecker and Associates, Inc., Akima Support Operations, and AtkinsRéalis. From June 1, 2006, it was operated by Jefferson Science Associates, LLC, a limited liability company created by Southeastern Universities Research Association and PAE Applied Technologies. In 2021, Jefferson Science Association became a wholly owned subsidiary of Southeastern Universities Research Association.

Until 1996 TJNAF was known as the Continuous Electron Beam Accelerator Facility (CEBAF); commonly, this name is still used for the main accelerator. Founded in 1984, Jefferson Lab employs more than 750 people, and more than 2,000 scientists from around the world have conducted research using the facility.

== History ==
The facility was established in 1984 (first initial funding by the Department of Energy) as the Continuous Electron Beam Accelerator Facility (CEBAF) by the Southeastern Universities Research Association; the name was changed to Thomas Jefferson National Accelerator Facility in 1996. The full funding for construction was appropriated by US Congress in 1986 and on February 13, 1987, the construction of the main component, the CEBAF accelerator began. The first beam was delivered to the experimental area on 1 July 1994. The design energy of 4 GeV for the beam was achieved during the year 1995. The laboratory dedication took place on May 24, 1996 (at this event the name was also changed). Full initial operations with all three initial experiment areas online at the design energy was achieved on June 19, 1998. On August 6, 2000, the CEBAF reached "enhanced design energy" of 6 GeV. In 2001, plans for an energy upgrade to 12 GeV electron beam and plans to construct a fourth experimental hall area started. The plans progressed through various DOE Critical Decision-stages in the 2000s decade, with the final DOE acceptance in 2008 and the construction on the 12 GeV upgrade beginning in 2009. May 18, 2012 the original 6 GeV CEBAF accelerator shut down for the replacement of the accelerator components for the 12 GeV upgrade. 178 experiments were completed with the original CEBAF.

In addition to the accelerator, the laboratory houses a free-electron laser (FEL) instrument. The construction of the FEL started June 11, 1996. It achieved first light on June 17, 1998. Since then, the FEL has been upgraded numerous times, increasing its power and capabilities substantially.

Jefferson Lab was also involved in the construction of the Spallation Neutron Source (SNS) in Oak Ridge and its upgrade, and the Electron Ion Collider at Brookhaven National laboratory. Jefferson builds superconducting accelerator and helium refrigeration systems for DOE accelerators around the national laboratory complex.

== Accelerator ==
The laboratory's main research facility is the CEBAF accelerator, which consists of a polarized electron source and injector and a pair of superconducting RF linear accelerators that are 1400 m (7/8-mile) in length and connected to each other by two arc sections that contain steering magnets. As the electron beam makes up to five successive orbits, its energy is increased up to a maximum of 6 GeV (the original CEBAF machine worked first in 1995 at the design energy of 4 GeV before reaching "enhanced design energy" of 6 GeV in 2000; since then the facility has been upgraded into 12 GeV energy). This leads to a design that appears similar to a racetrack when compared to the classical ring-shaped accelerators found at sites such as CERN or Fermilab. Effectively, CEBAF is a linear accelerator, similar to SLAC at Stanford, that has been folded up to a tenth of its normal length.

The design of CEBAF allows the electron beam to be continuous rather than the pulsed beam typical of ring shaped accelerators. (There is some beam structure, but the pulses are very much shorter and closer together.) The electron beam is directed onto four potential targets (see below). One of the distinguishing features of Jefferson Lab is the continuous nature of the electron beam, with a bunch length of less than 1 picosecond. Another is Jefferson Lab's use of superconducting Radio Frequency (SRF) technology, which uses liquid helium to cool niobium to approximately 2 K (−456.5 °F), removing electrical resistance and allowing the most efficient transfer of energy to an electron. To achieve this, Jefferson Lab houses the world's largest liquid helium refrigerator, and it was one of the first large-scale implementations of SRF technology. The accelerator is built 8 meters below the Earth's surface, or approximately 25 feet, and the walls of the accelerator tunnels are 2 feet thick.

The beam ends in four experimental halls, labelled Hall A, Hall B, Hall C, and Hall D. Each hall contains specialized spectrometers to record the products of collisions between the electron beam or with real photons and a stationary target. This allows physicists to study the structure of the atomic nucleus, specifically the interaction of the quarks that make up protons and neutrons of the nucleus.

With each revolution around the accelerator, the beam passes through each of the two LINAC accelerators, but through a different set of bending magnets in semi-circular arcs at the ends of the linacs. The electrons make up to five passes through the linear accelerators.

When a nucleus in the target is hit by an electron from the beam, an "interaction", or "event", occurs, scattering particles into the hall. Each hall contains an array of particle detectors that track the physical properties of the particles produced by the event. The detectors generate electrical pulses that are converted into digital values by analog-to-digital converters (ADCs), time to digital converters (TDCs) and pulse counters (scalers).

This digital data is gathered and stored so that the physicist can later analyze the data and reconstruct the physics that occurred. The system of electronics and computers that perform this task is called a data acquisition system.

=== 12 GeV upgrade ===
As of June 2010, construction began on a $338 million upgrade to add an end station, Hall D, on the opposite end of the accelerator from the other three halls, as well as to double beam energy to 12 GeV. Concurrently, an addition to the Test Lab, (where the SRF cavities used in CEBAF and other accelerators used worldwide are manufactured) was constructed.

As of May 2014, the upgrade achieved a new record for beam energy, at 10.5 GeV, delivering beam to Hall D.

As of December 2016, the CEBAF accelerator delivered full-energy electrons as part of commissioning activities for the ongoing 12 GeV Upgrade project. Operators of the Continuous Electron Beam Accelerator Facility delivered the first batch of 12 GeV electrons (12.065 Giga electron Volts) to its newest experimental hall complex, Hall D.

In September 2017, the official notification from the DOE of the formal approval of the 12 GeV upgrade project completion and start of operations was issued. By spring 2018, all fours research areas were successfully receiving beam and performing experiments. On 2 May 2018 the CEBAF 12 GeV Upgrade Dedication Ceremony took place.

As of December 2018, the CEBAF accelerator delivered electron beams to all four experimental halls simultaneously for physics-quality production running. A technical full description of the accelerator upgrade and subsequent performance appeared in 2024.

== Physics program ==
Jefferson Lab conducts a broad program of research using the electromagnetic interaction to probe the structure of the nucleon (protons and neutrons), the production and decay of light mesons, and aspects of the interactions of nucleons in the atomic nucleus. The main tools are the scattering of electrons and the creation and use of high energy real photons. In addition, both electron and photon beams can be made highly polarized, allowing exploration of so-called spin degrees of freedom in investigations.

The four experimental halls have distinct but overlapping research goals, but with instrumentation unique to each.

=== Hall A ===
Matching high resolution spectrometers (HRS) have been used to study deep-inelastic electron scattering. Using very well controlled polarized electron beams, parity violation in electron scattering has been studied.

=== Hall B ===
The CLAS detector was the mainstay of the Hall B experimental program from 1998 to 2012. Physics Working Groups in the areas of Deep-Inelastic Interactions, Hadron Spectroscopy, and Nuclear Interactions exist. See the article related to the spectrometer itself and physics program at the link CLAS. Polarized real photons and electron beams were used. Physics targets included liquid hydrogen and deuterium, as well as massive nuclear materials.

In the era of 12 GeV beams at Jefferson Lab, the Hall B program has been restructured to include a new detector called CLAS12, as well as several other experiments using more specialized hardware.

=== Hall C ===
Multiple spectrometers and specialized equipment has been used to study, for example, parity-violating electron scattering to measure the weak charge of the proton and hypernuclear production with the electromagnetic interaction.

=== Hall D ===
This experimental hall was built for the beginning of the 12 GeV beam-energy program starting in 2014. This hall houses the GlueX experiment, which is designed to map out the light unflavored meson spectrum in detail in the search for explicit gluonic excitations in mesons.

== Free electron laser ==
JLab houses the world's most powerful tunable free electron laser, with an output of over 14 kilowatts.

== CODA ==
Since CEBAF has three complementary experiments running simultaneously, it was decided that the three data acquisition systems should be as similar as possible, so that physicists moving from one experiment to another would find a familiar environment. To that end, a group of specialist physicists was hired to form a data acquisition development group to develop a common system for all three halls. CODA, the CEBAF Online Data Acquisition system, was the result.

CODA is a set of software tools and recommended hardware that facilitates a data acquisition system for nuclear physics experiments. In nuclear and particle physics experiments, the particle tracks are digitized by the data acquisition system, but the detectors are capable of generating a large number of possible measurements, or "data channels".

Typically, the ADC, TDC, and other digital electronics are large circuit boards with connectors at the front edge that provide input and output for digital signals, and a connector at the back that plugs into a backplane. A group of boards is plugged into a chassis, or "crate", that provides physical support, power, and cooling for the boards and backplane. This arrangement allows electronics capable of digitizing many hundreds of channels to be compressed into a single chassis.

In the CODA system, each chassis contains a board that is an intelligent controller for the rest of the chassis. This board, called a ReadOut Controller (ROC), configures each of the digitizing boards upon first receiving data, reads the data from the digitizers, and formats the data for later analysis.

== Directors ==
The following persons served as the director of the Thomas Jefferson National Accelerator Facility:

No.	Image	Director	Term start	Term end	Refs.
1		Hermann A. Grunder	May 1985	2000	
interim		Christoph W. Leemann	2000	2001	
2		Christoph W. Leemann	2001	September 1, 2008	
3		Hugh E. Montgomery	September 2, 2008	April 2, 2017	
4		Stuart Henderson	April 3, 2017	August 1, 2024	
5		Kimberly Sawyer	August 2, 2024	June 29, 2025	
6		Jens Dilling	June 30, 2025	present	

== See also ==
- EMC effect
