= Landsberg (surname) =

Landsberg is a surname associated with the German noble Landsberg family. Notable people with the surname include:

- Agnes of Landsberg (12th-century–1266), German noblewoman
- Barthold Nicolai Landsberg (c.1668 – 1740) Norwegian military officer
- Berthold II of Landsberg (before 1464–1502), German bishop
- Clara Landsberg (1873–1966), American educator
- David Landsberg, American actor, writer, producer and director
- Eddie Landsberg (born 1971), Tokyo-based, Philadelphia-born jazz organist
- Ernst Landsberg, German jurist
- Georg Landsberg (1865–1912), German mathematician
- Greg Landsberg, American physicist
- Grigory Landsberg, Soviet physicist
- Herrad of Landsberg (died 1195), Alsatian nun and abbess of Hohenburg Abbey in the Vosges mountains
- Hilary Landsberg (1834–1898), Polish cloth manufacturer
- Johan Landsberg (born 1974), Swedish tennis player
- John Justus of Landsberg (1489–1539), German Carthusian monk and ascetical writer
- Karl Landsberg (1890–1964), Swedish cyclist
- Klaus Landsberg (1916–1956), German-American electrical engineer, pioneer of television
- Leopold Landsberg (1861–1935), Jewish industrialist in Russia and Poland
- Marceli Landsberg (1890–1951), Polish physician, specialist in internal medicine and contagious diseases, professor of the Medical Academy in Lodz
- Meyer Landsberg (1810–1870), German rabbi
- Michael Landsberg (born 1957), Canadian sports journalist
- Michele Landsberg, Canadian writer
- Mort Landsberg (1919–1970), American NFL player
- Natalia Landsberg (1846–1910), Russian anarchist activist
- Otto Landsberg (1869–1957), German jurist, politician and diplomat
- Paul-Louis Landsberg (1901–1944), German-Jewish existentialist philosopher
- Rolf Landsberg (1920–2003), German professor of physical chemistry
- William Landsberg (1915–2013), Brooklyn-born modernist architect
- Sophie of Landsberg (c. 1250–1318), German princess, member of the House of Wettin and by marriage Duchess of Glogów
- Theodoric of Landsberg (1242–1285), member of the House of Wettin, Margrave of Landsberg from 1265 until his death

== See also ==
- Landsbergis, the Lithuanian variation of the name Landsberg
