= Landsberg =

Landsberg may refer to:

- Landsberg family
- Landsberg (surname)

== Places ==
- Landsberg (district), Bavaria, Germany
- Landsberg, Saxony-Anhalt, Germany
- Landsberg am Lech, Bavaria, Germany
  - Landsberg-Lech Air Base, Germany
  - Landsberg Prison, a prison in Landsberg am Lech
  - Kaufering concentration camp complex
- Landsberg an der Warthe, German name of Gorzów Wielkopolski, Poland
- Landsberg in Oberschlesien/Upper Silesia, German name of Gorzów Śląski, Poland
- Landsberg in Ostpreußen/East Prussia, German name of Górowo Iławeckie, Poland
- Landsberg Castle (disambiguation)
- Margraviate of Landsberg, a march of the Holy Roman Empire
- Palatinate-Landsberg, a state of the Holy Roman Empire

== See also ==
- Altlandsberg
- Deutschlandsberg
- Landsberge
- Landsberger
- Landsbergis, a surname
