= Refuge area =

Refuge area may refer to:

- Area of refuge, an emergency shelter area.
- Pesticide refuge area, a technique in agriculture.
- Refugee camp
