= Cecilia Gerber =

Argentine-American physicist

Cecilia Elena Gerber is an Argentine-American experimental high-energy physicist whose research involves massive elementary particles: the top quark and Higgs boson. She is UIC Distinguished Professor of Physics and director of undergraduate studies in physics at the University of Illinois Chicago, and the co-director of the LHC Physics Center at Fermilab. Her research has included participation in the DØ experiment at Fermilab and the Compact Muon Solenoid experiment at the Large Hadron Collider in France and Switzerland.

== Education and career ==
Gerber earned a licenciada in Physics from the University of Buenos Aires in 1990. While continuing at the University of Buenos Aires as a doctoral student, she came to Fermilab as a visiting student, to work on the DØ experiment there, part of an initiative by Leon M. Lederman to involve Latin American physicists in Fermilab's research. She completed her Ph.D. through the University of Buenos Aires in 1995, supervised by Ricardo N. Piegaia.

After postdoctoral research at Fermilab, she joined the University of Illinois Chicago in 2000.

== Recognition ==
In 2010, Gerber was elected as a Fellow of the American Physical Society (APS), after a nomination from the APS Division of Particles and Fields, "for her numerous contributions to the D0 experiment, especially the implementation of the D0 muon and silicon trackers and the elucidation of the characteristics of top quarks in the strong production of top-antitop pairs and the electroweak production of single top quarks". She was named to the 2021 class of Fellows of the American Association for the Advancement of Science.
