= Linda G. Stutte =

American particle physicist

- Born: Linda Gail Stutte
- Education: MIT, UCBerkeley
- Known for: Neutrino Area beams, Muon Detectors, E594, D0, SELEX experiments
- Scientific career
- Fields: Particle Physics
- Workplaces: Fermilab
- Doctoral advisor: Harry H. Bingham and W. B. Fretters

Linda Gail Stutte is an experimental elementary particle physicist. After an appointment as a postdoc at Caltech in 1974–76, Stutte was a research staff scientist at the Fermi National Accelerator Laboratory from 1976 through her retirement in 2007. She is known for work on neutrino experiments and her expertise with Fermliab neutrino beam facilities.

== Education ==
Stutte attended the Massachusetts Institute of Technology for her undergraduate work and earned a PhD from UC, Berkeley in 1973. Her PhD advisors were W. B. Fretter and H. H. Bingham.

== Career ==
Stutte's research at Fermilab has focused on high-energy physics through software and hardware development, neutrino-beam research and management of the DØ experiment. She became an expert on the Fermilab neutrino beams and was one of the few physicists who could tune the Neutrino Area beams that provided data for the bubble chambers and the large neutrino experiments.

=== Neutrino beams at Fermilab ===
During her time at Fermilab, Stutte was the area coordinator for the Neutrino Area. Her contributions include measurements of the properties of neutrino beams and design and testing of new beams. Beam design involves the ability to envision multiple interacting parameters to produce a beam with specified optimal properties, for instance, energy spectrum, beam emittance, properties of steering and focusing magnets, and beam position and intensity monitors.

=== E594 experiment ===
This neutrino experiment at Fermilab is an inverse muon decay. E594 studied the reaction (ν_{μ}) (muon neutrino) striking an electron, and producing an electron neutrino, not detected, and a μ (muon), detected by the flash calorimeter. There is a large background of unwanted events; the flash calorimeter helped to separate these desired events from the unwanted background. Dr. Stutte was an expert on the detector and data acquisition system.

=== DØ (DZero) experiment ===
Stutte participated in the DØ experiment at the Tevatron from 1983 through 2007 and was elevated to department leader in 2002. She worked extensively with the muon detection system.

=== SELEX experiment ===
Stutte participated in the SELEX experiment (E781) at Fermilab. The SELEX (SEgmented Large-X baryon spectrometer EXperiment) was run to study charmed baryons. She worked on the RICH Cherenkov detectors. This experiment made many observations, including confirmation of the doubly charged baryon xi+cc (3520). The SELEX experiment is described in the proceedings of the Hadron 97 7th international conference.

=== Retirement ===
Stutte retired in 2007 from Fermilab. Haley Bridger wrote her retirement announcement, which appeared in the September 20, 2007, issue of Fermilab today.

== See also ==
- D0 experiment
- Fermilab
- Accelerator neutrino
- Muon

== Awards and recognitions ==
Stutte received a 10-year award from Leon Lederman and 30-year service award from Pier Oddone.
