= Control room =

Room from which a facility is controlled

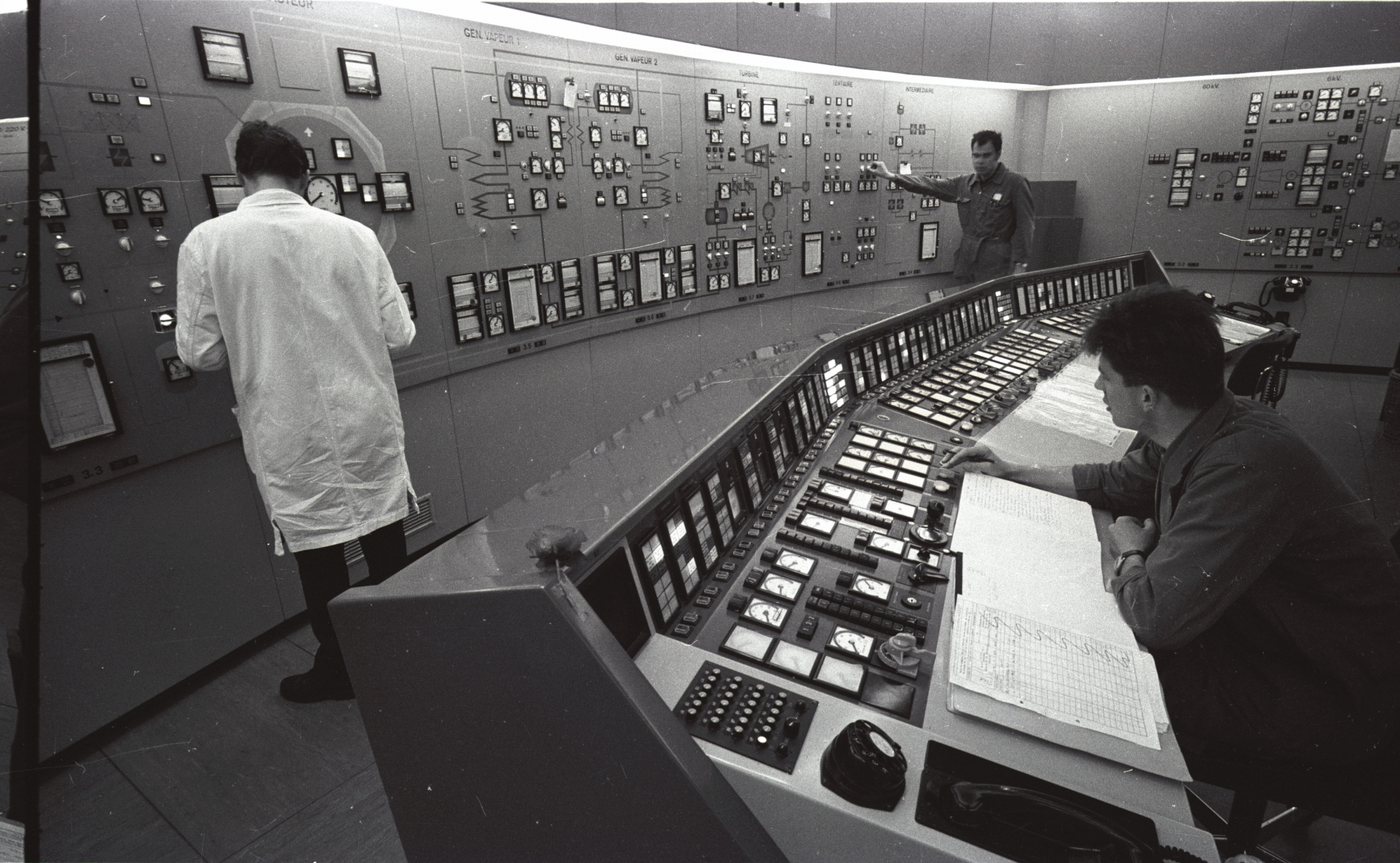
The Lucens reactor's control room

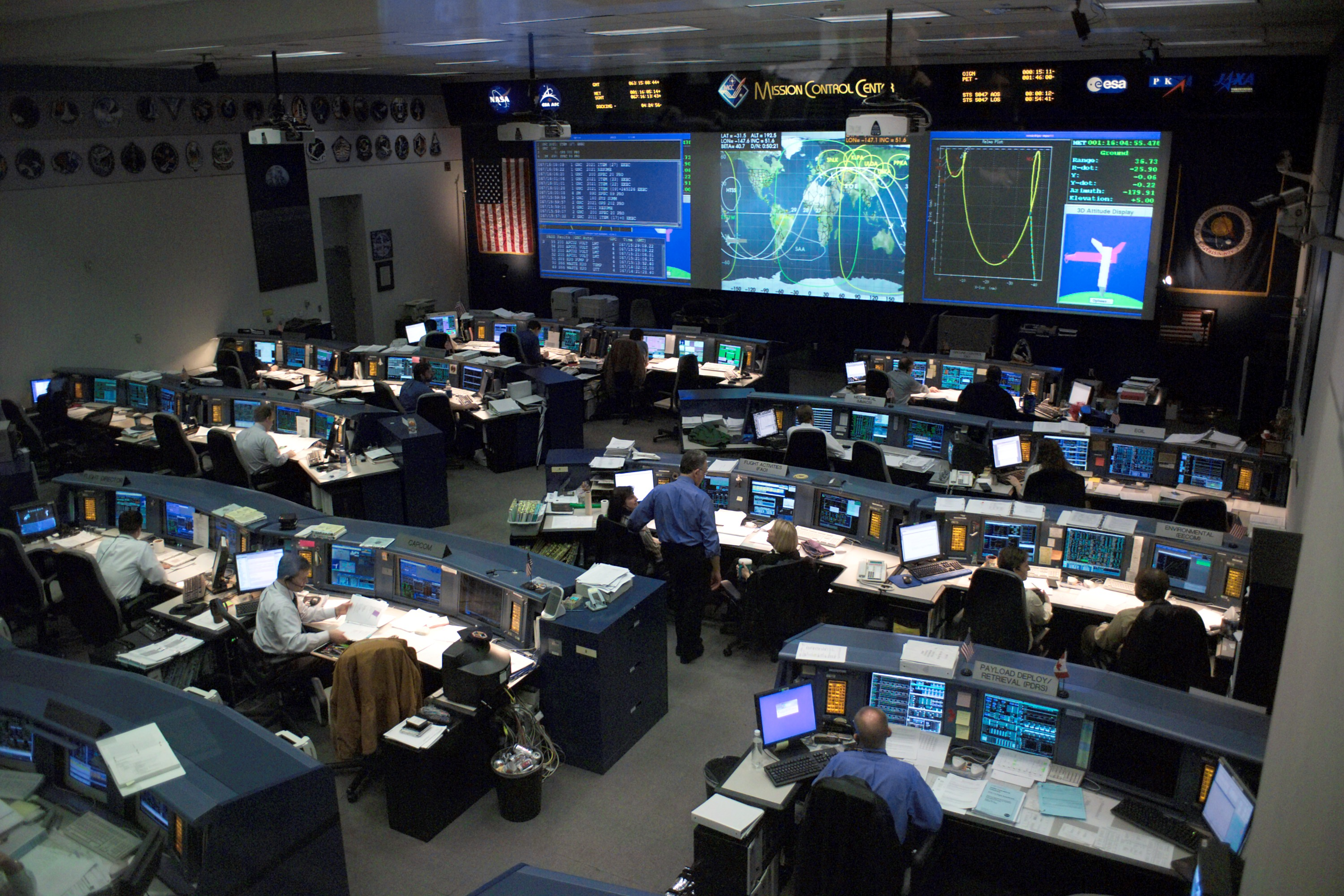
NASA's "Shuttle" (White) Flight Control Room in Houston, Texas

A control room or operations room is a central space where a large physical facility (such as a power plant) or physically dispersed service (such as a network of driverless transit trains) can be monitored and controlled. It is often part of a larger command center.

== Overview ==
A control room's purpose is production control, and serves as a central space where a large physical facility or physically dispersed service can be monitored and controlled. Central control rooms came into general use in factories during the 1920s.

Control rooms for vital facilities are typically tightly secured and inaccessible to the general public. Multiple electronic displays and control panels are usually present, and there may also be a large wall-sized display area visible from all locations within the space. Some control rooms are themselves under continuous video surveillance and recording, for security and personnel accountability purposes. Many control rooms are occupied on a "24/7/365" basis, and may have multiple people on duty at all times (such as implementation of a "two-man rule"), to ensure continuous vigilance.

Other special-purpose control room spaces may be temporarily set up for special projects (such as an oceanographic exploration mission), and closed or dismantled once the project is concluded.

== Examples ==
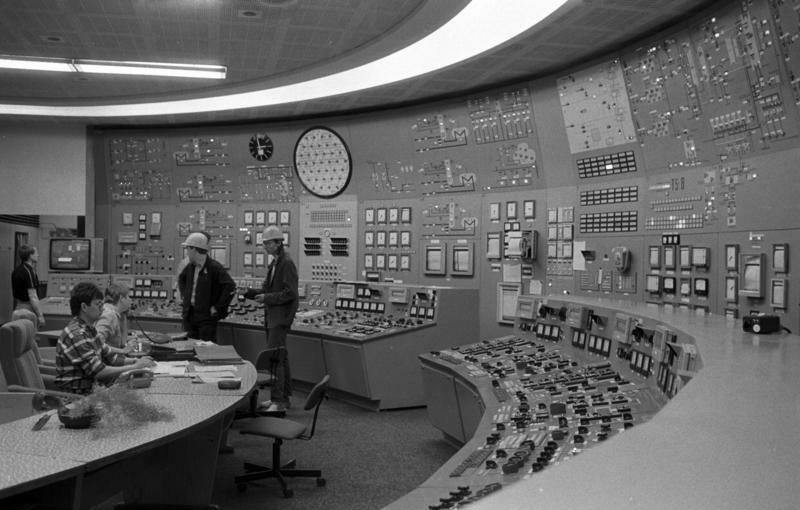
Greifswald Nuclear Power Plant control room in 1990.

Control rooms are typically found in installations such as:

- Nuclear power plants and other power-generating stations
- Electric power distribution companies and other Utilities
- Oil refineries and chemical plants
- Airlines, where they are often referred to as operations control centers, and are responsible for flight operations dispatch, monitoring and support
- Major transportation facilities such as bridges, tunnels, canals and rapid transit systems, where they are often staffed 24 hours a day to monitor and report on traffic congestion and to respond to emergencies
- Military facilities (ranging in scale from a missile silo to NORAD), also referred to as operations rooms
- NASA flight controllers work in several "flight control rooms" in mission control centers; affiliated facilities, such as the Jet Propulsion Laboratory have their own control rooms
- Computerized data centers, often serving remote users in multiple time zones
- Network operations centers
- Large institutions such as universities, hospitals, major research facilities (such as particle accelerator laboratories), high security prisons, and theme parks
- Facilities which handle calls to the emergency services including police, fire service and emergency medical service
- Call centers, which may use them to monitor incoming and outgoing communications of customer service representatives, and to provide general oversight
- Rail operations centers, such as the Union Pacific Harriman Dispatch Center, control rail operations over thousands of miles of railroad. Train dispatchers staff these facilities around the clock to manage efficient rail operations. In the UK, they are usually operated separately by each train operating company or by Network Rail, and include train crew and rolling stock resourcing.

== Special hazards and mitigation ==
Control rooms are usually equipped with elaborate fire suppression and security systems to safeguard their contents and occupants, and to ensure continued operation in emergencies. In hazardous environments, they may also be areas of refuge for personnel trapped on-site. They are typically crowded with equipment, mounted in multi-function rack mount cabinets to allow updating. The concentration of equipment often requires special electrical uninterruptible power supply (UPS) feeds and air conditioning.

Since the control equipment is intended to control other items in the surrounding facility, these often fire-resistance rated service rooms require many penetrations for cables. Due to routine equipment updates, these penetrations are subject to frequent changes, requiring maintenance programs to include vigilant firestop management for code compliance.

Due to the sensitive equipment in control room cabinets, it is useful to ensure the use of "T-rated" firestops that are massive and thick enough to resist heat transmission to the inside of the control room. It is also common to place control rooms under positive pressure ventilation to prevent smoke or toxic gases from entering. If used, gaseous fire suppressants must occupy the space that is to be protected for a minimum period of time to be sure a fire can be completely extinguished. Openings in such spaces must therefore be kept to a minimum to prevent the escape of the suppression gas.

A mobile control room is designated as particularly in high risk facilities, such as a nuclear power station or a petrochemical facility. It can provided a guaranteed life support for the anticipated safety control.

== Design ==
The design of a control room incorporates ergonomic and aesthetic features including optimum traffic flow, acoustics, illumination, and health and safety of the workers. Ergonomic considerations determine the placement of humans and equipment to ensure that operators can easily move into, out of, and around the control room, and can interact with each other without any hindrances during emergency situations; and to keep noise and other distractions to a minimum.

Ergonomic control room design, through early assessment, optimized layout, well-managed alarms and acoustics, enhances performance, situational awareness, and operator well-being.

International standards like ISO 11064 provide guidelines for ergonomic control room design and are used worldwide across many industries.

== In popular culture ==
Control room scenes dealing with crisis situations appear frequently in thriller novels and action films. In addition, a few documentaries have been filmed with scenes in real-life control room settings.

- Fail-Safe - a 1964 Cold war thriller film directed by Sidney Lumet, based on the 1962 novel of the same name by Eugene Burdick and Harvey Wheeler. It portrays a fictional account of a Cold War nuclear crisis.
- The Prisoner - a 1967 British television series (17 episodes), which follows a British former secret agent who is abducted and held prisoner in a mysterious coastal village resort where his captors try to find out why he abruptly resigned from his job.
- The Taking of Pelham One Two Three - a 1974 American thriller film directed by Joseph Sargent, produced by Edgar J. Scherick, and starring Walter Matthau, Robert Shaw, Martin Balsam and Héctor Elizondo. Peter Stone adapted the screenplay, from the 1973 novel of the same name by Morton Freedgood (under the pen name John Godey) about a group of criminals taking hostage for ransom the passengers of a busy New York City Subway car.
- The China Syndrome - a 1979 American thriller film that tells the story of a television reporter and her cameraman who discover safety coverups at a nuclear power plant. It stars Jane Fonda, Jack Lemmon and Michael Douglas, with Douglas also serving as the film's producer.
- GoldenEye - a 1995 spy film, and 17th in the James Bond franchise, features 2 control rooms used for Command and control of a fictitious satellite based weapon, the original control room belonging to the USSR and a replica built by the Janus Crime Syndicate who have taken possession of the satellite for nefarious purposes. The latter also featured as a playable level in the videogame of the same name for the Nintendo 64.
- Minority Report - a 2002 American neo-noir science fiction thriller film directed by Steven Spielberg, and loosely based on the short story of the same name by Philip K. Dick. It is set primarily in Washington DC, and Northern Virginia in the year 2054, where "PreCrime", a specialized police department, apprehends criminals based on foreknowledge provided by three psychics called "precogs".
- Control Room - a 2004 documentary film about Al Jazeera and its relations with the US Central Command (CENTCOM), as well as the other news organizations that covered the 2003 invasion of Iraq.

== Image gallery ==
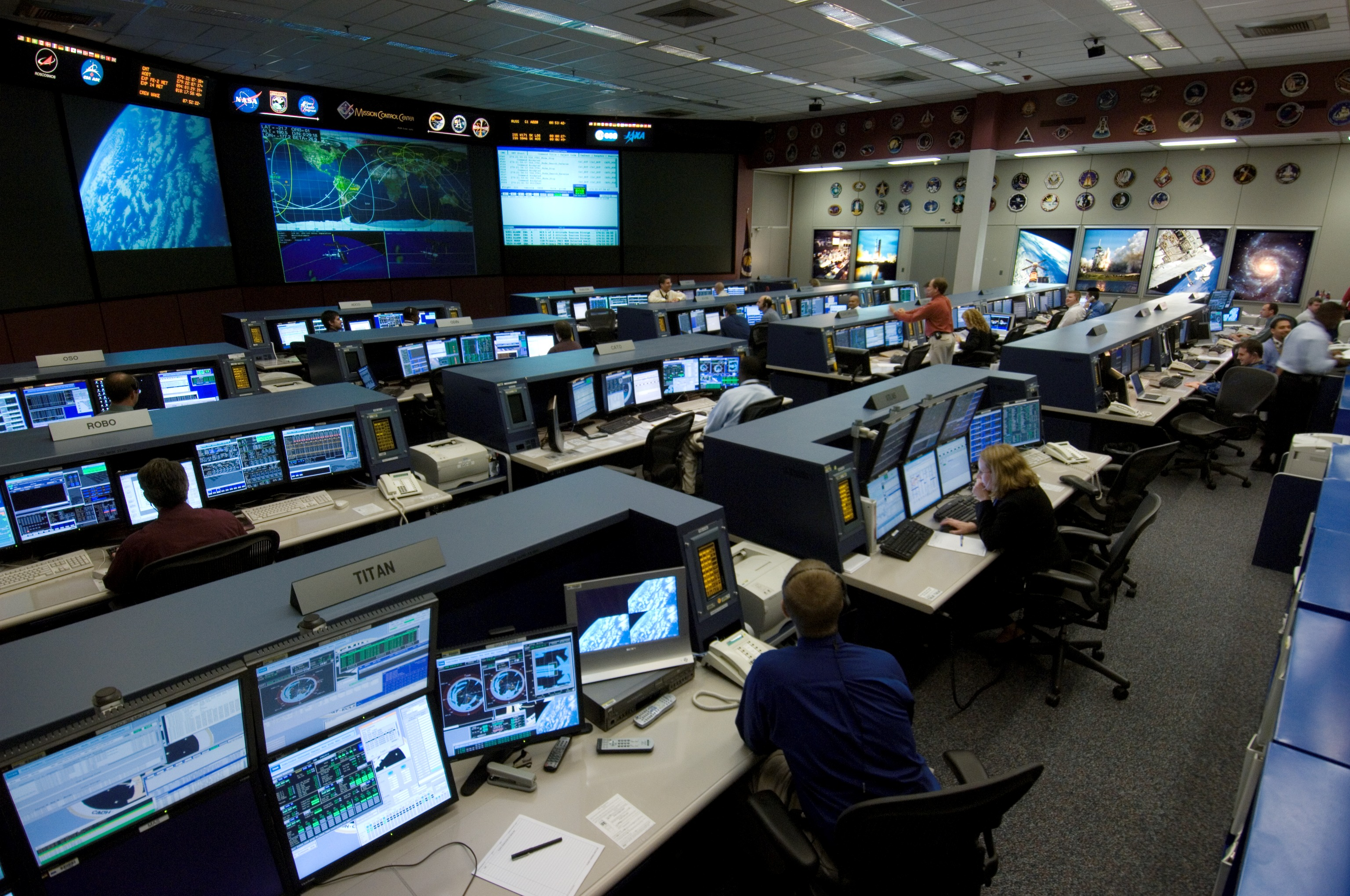
NASA control for the International Space Station (ISS)

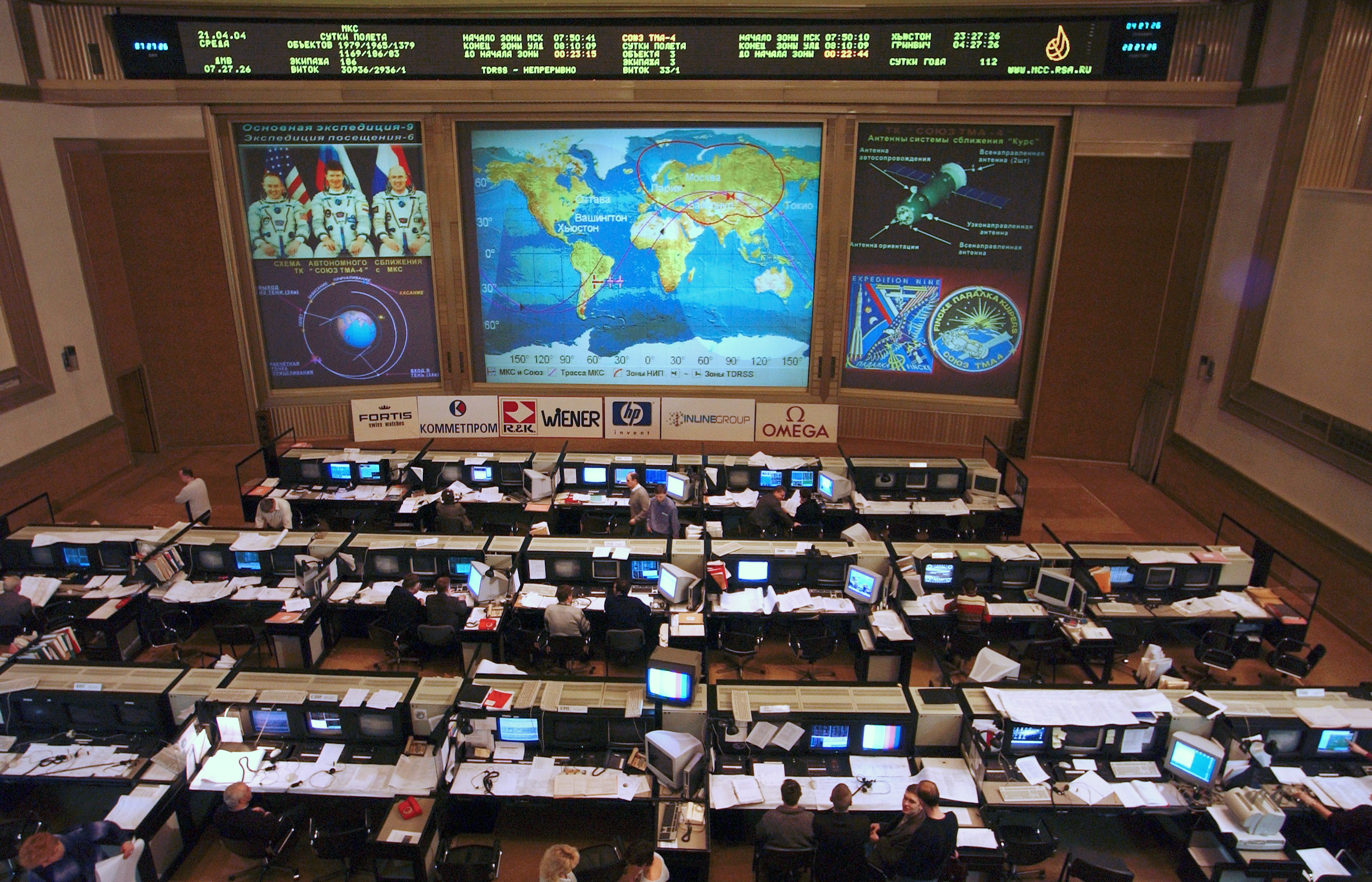
Russian mission control for the ISS

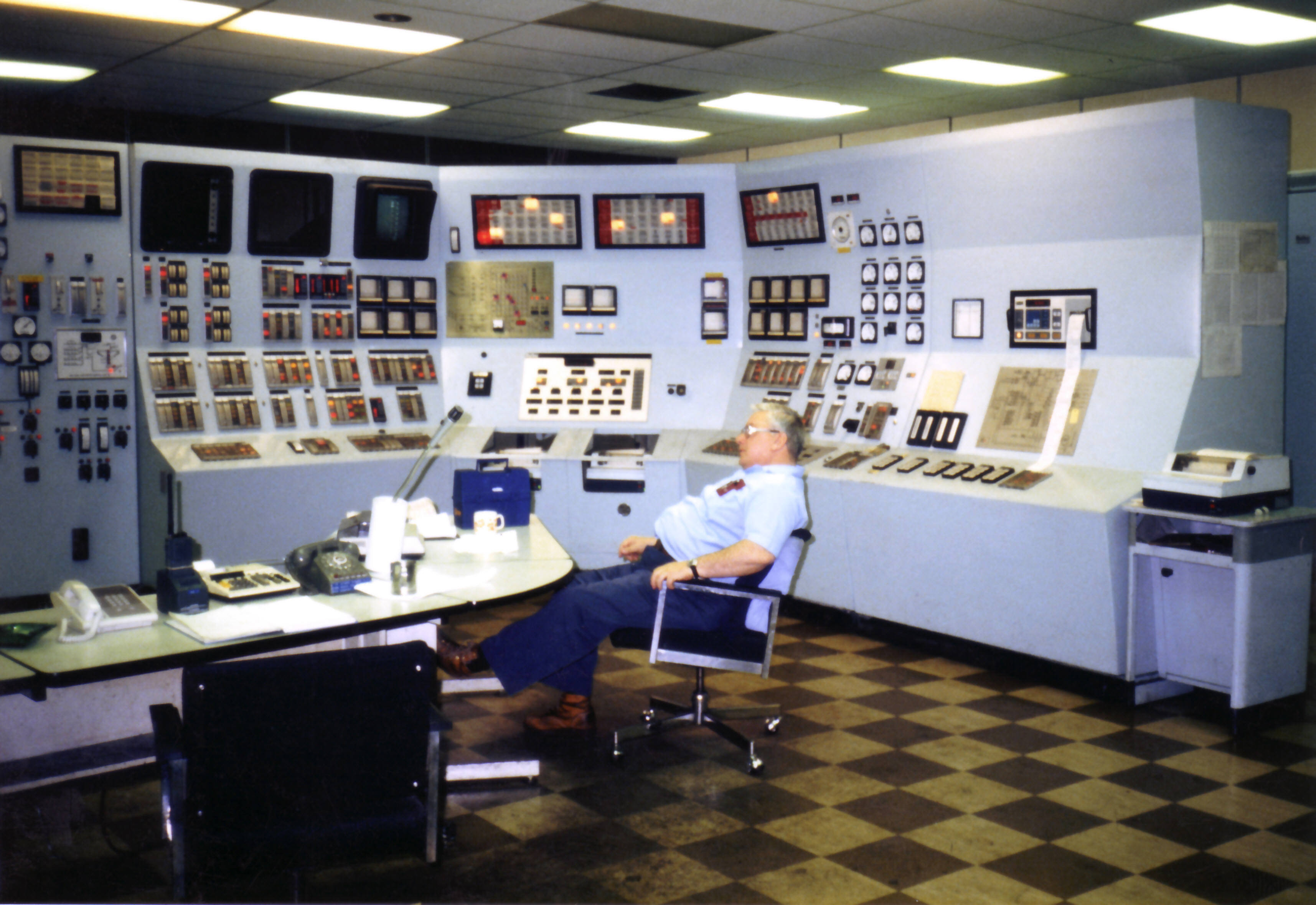
Fossil fuel power plant in Nova Scotia, Canada

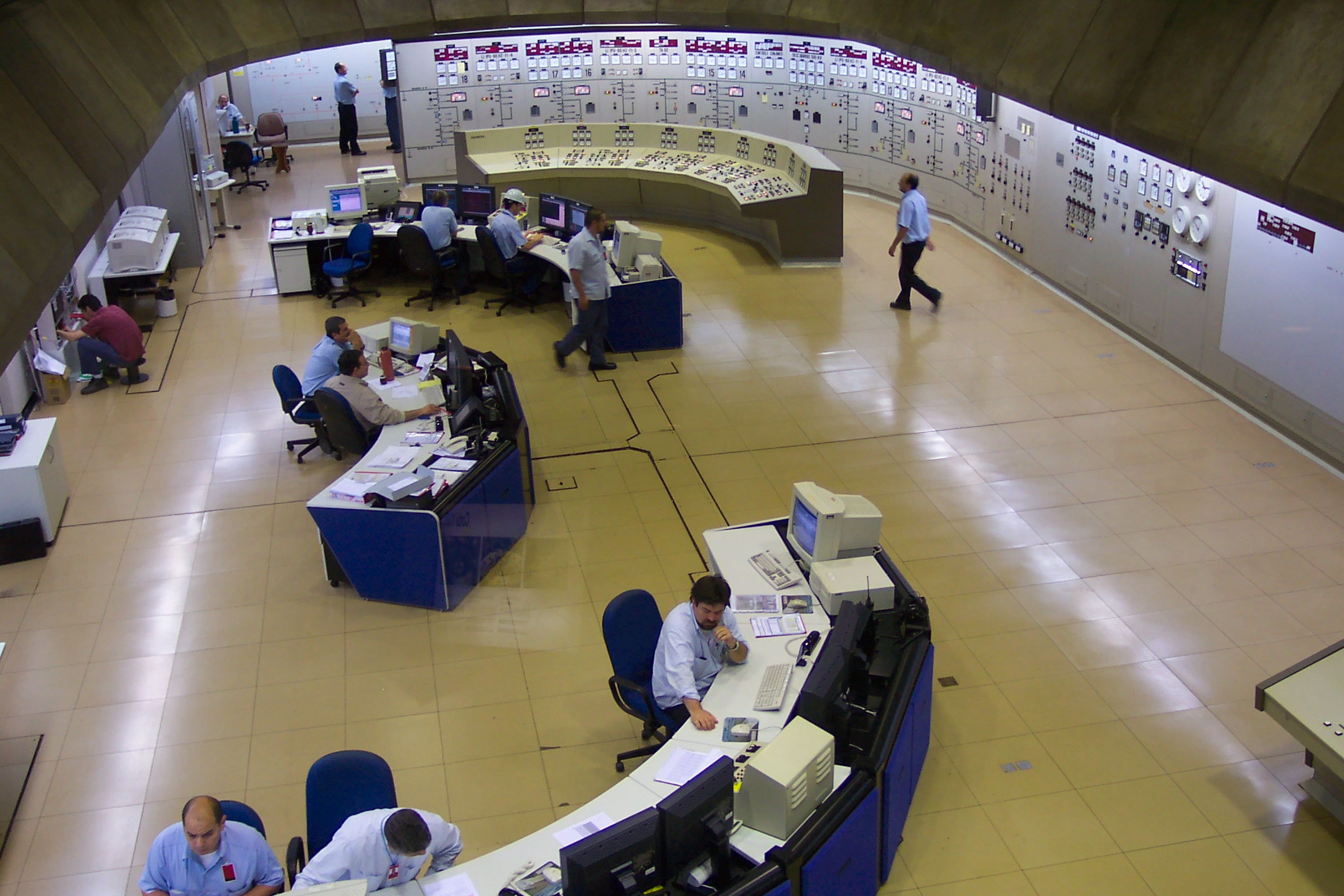
Hydroelectric power Itaipu dam jointly operated by Brazil and Paraguay

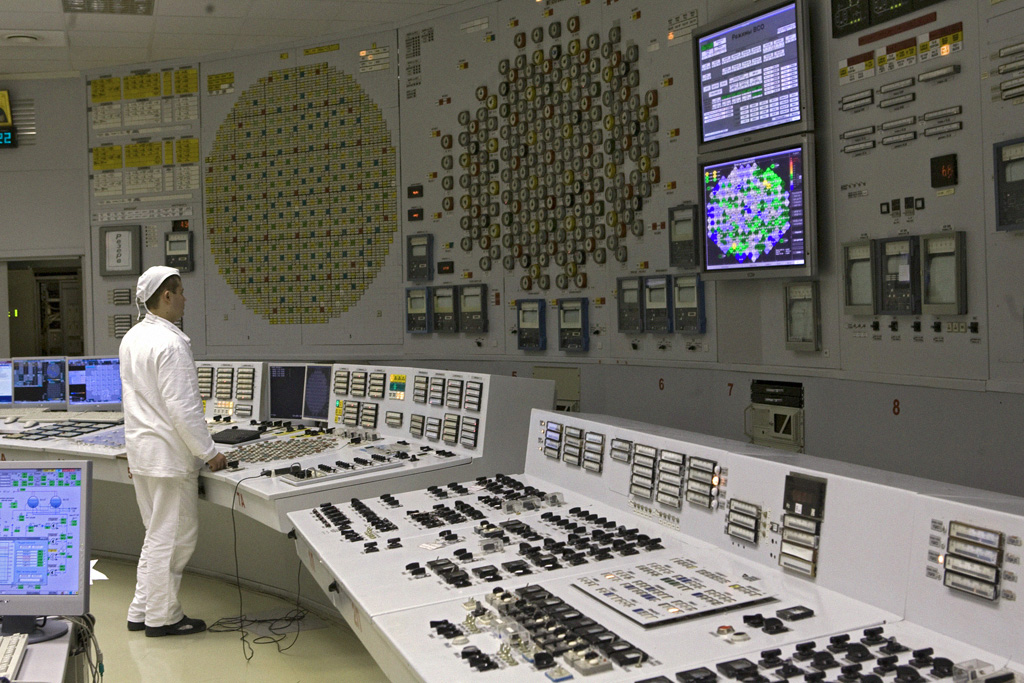
Nuclear power plant in Saint Petersburg, Russia

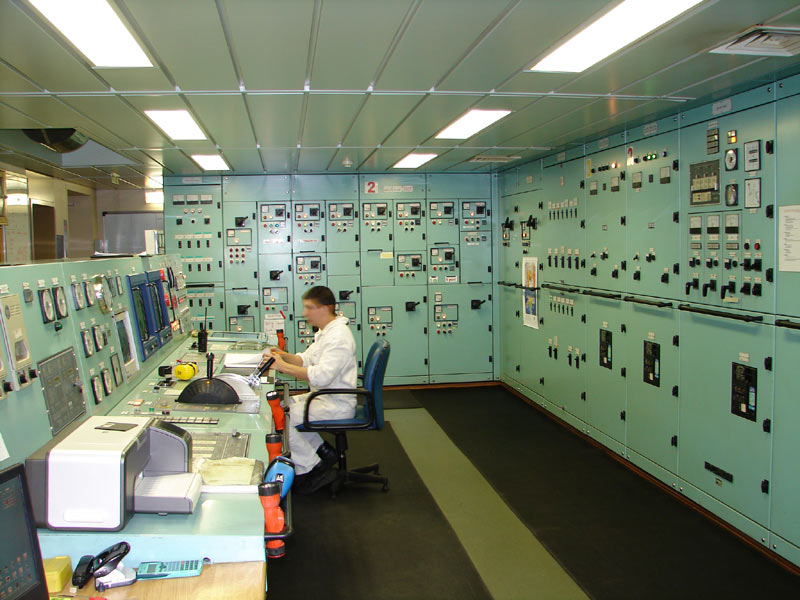
Engine control for an oil tanker ship

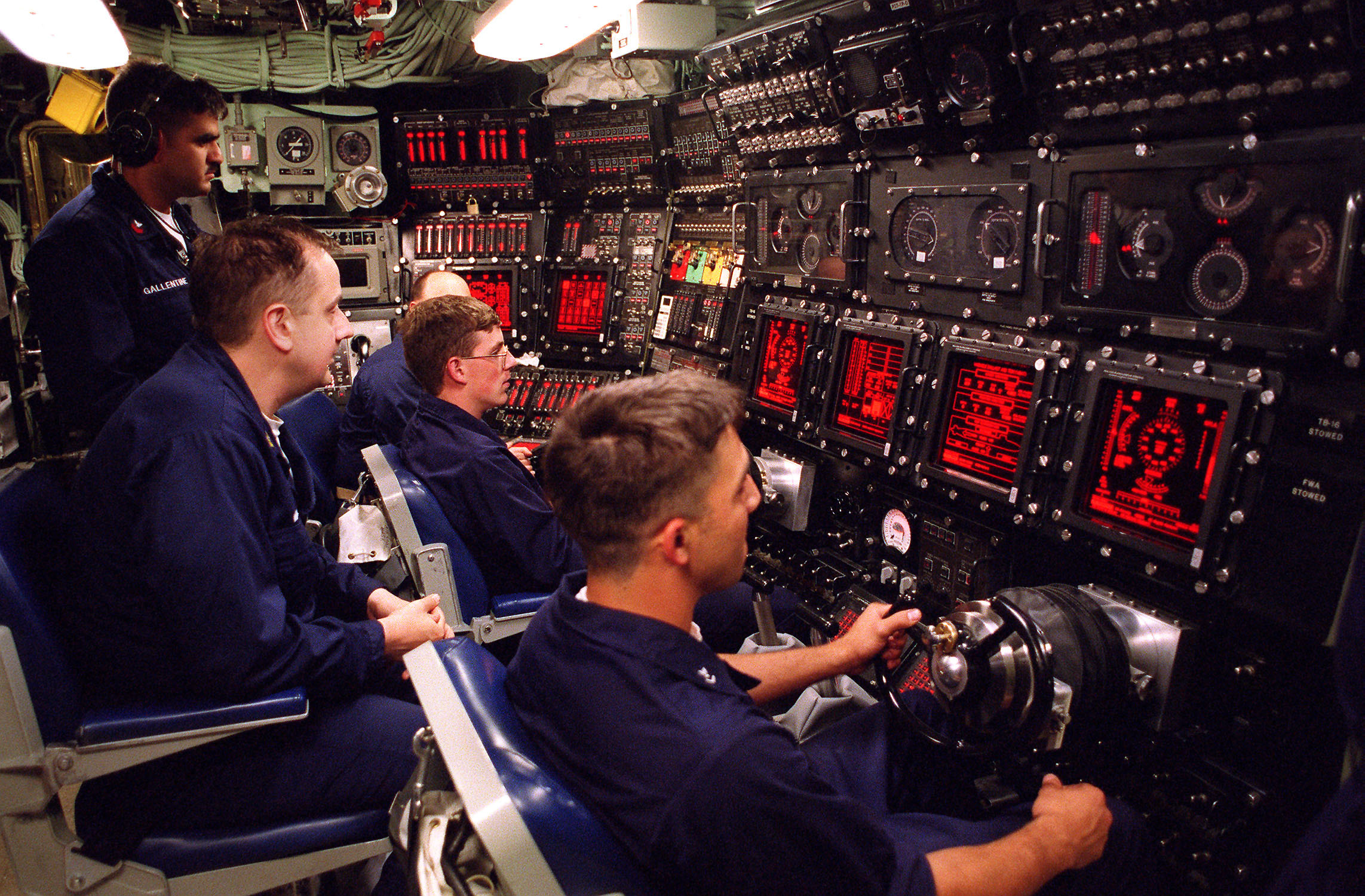
Submarine USS Seawolf (SSN 21)

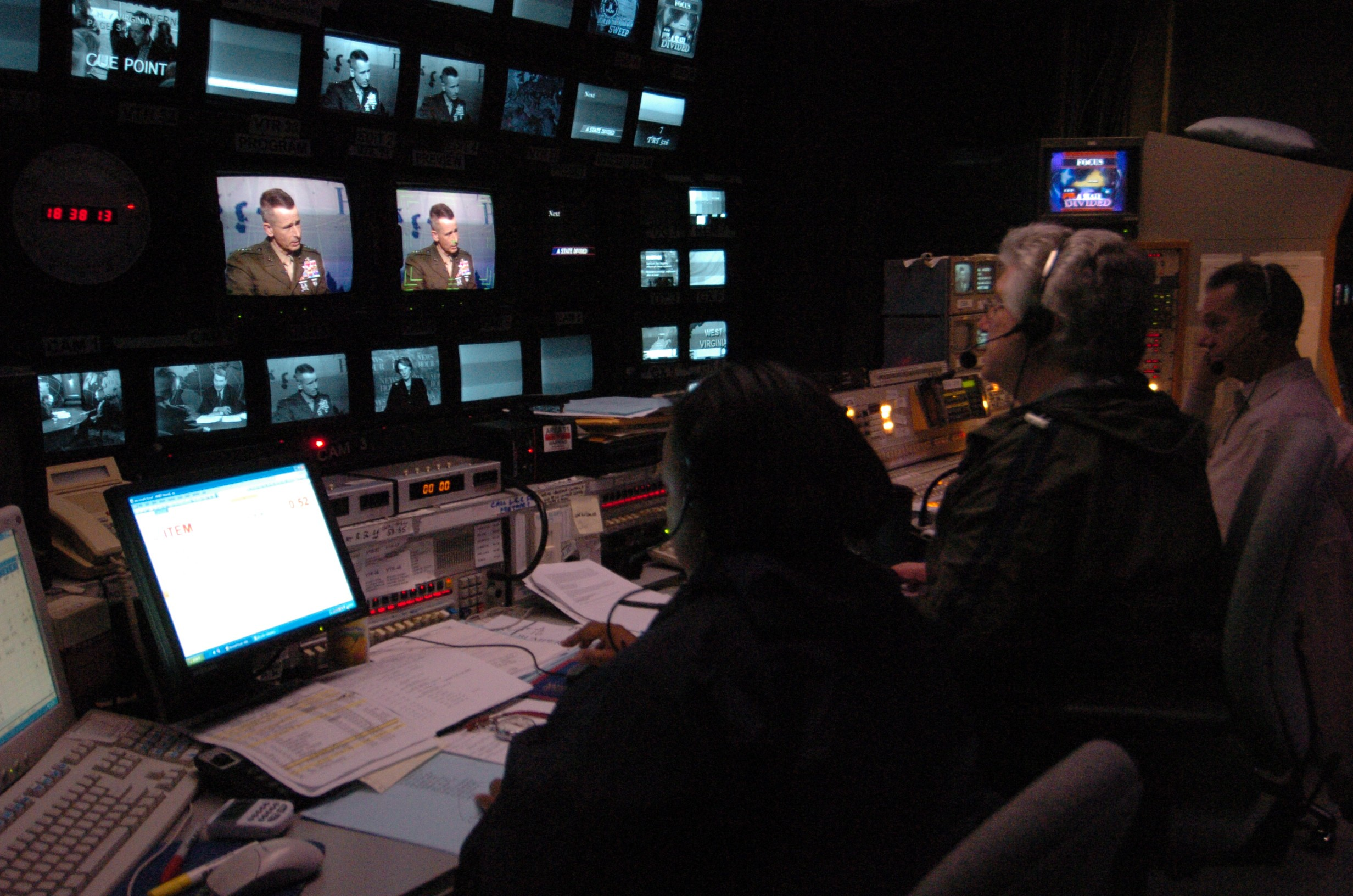
The NewsHour with Jim Lehrer broadcast newsroom

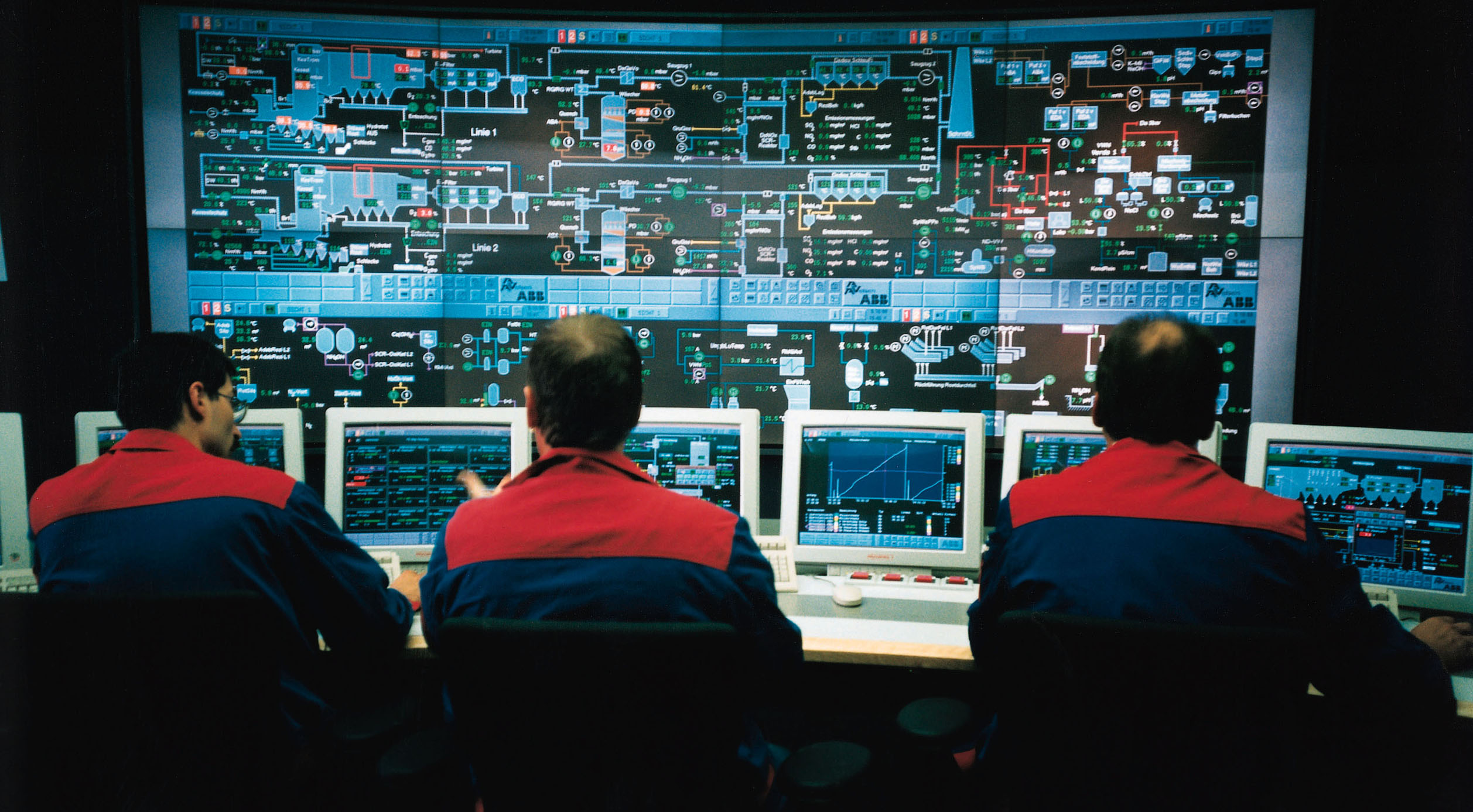
German solid waste incinerator

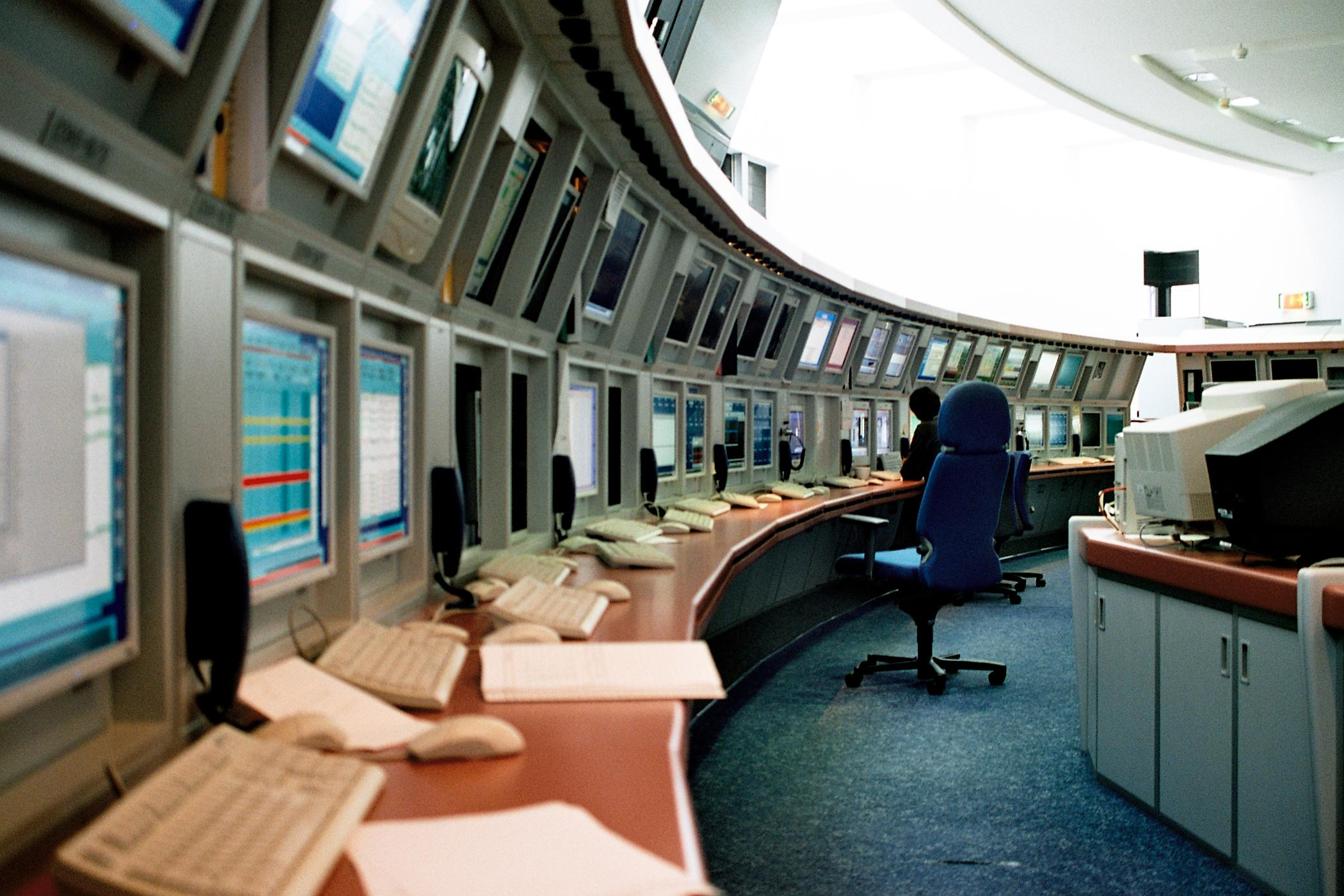
Meteorological satellite control in Germany

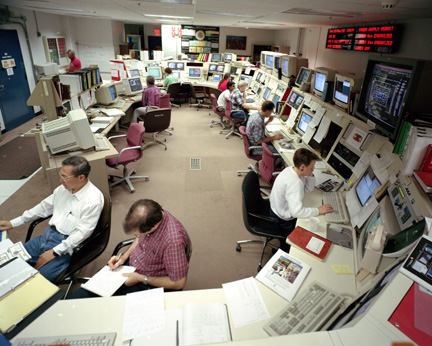
DZero experiment particle accelerator

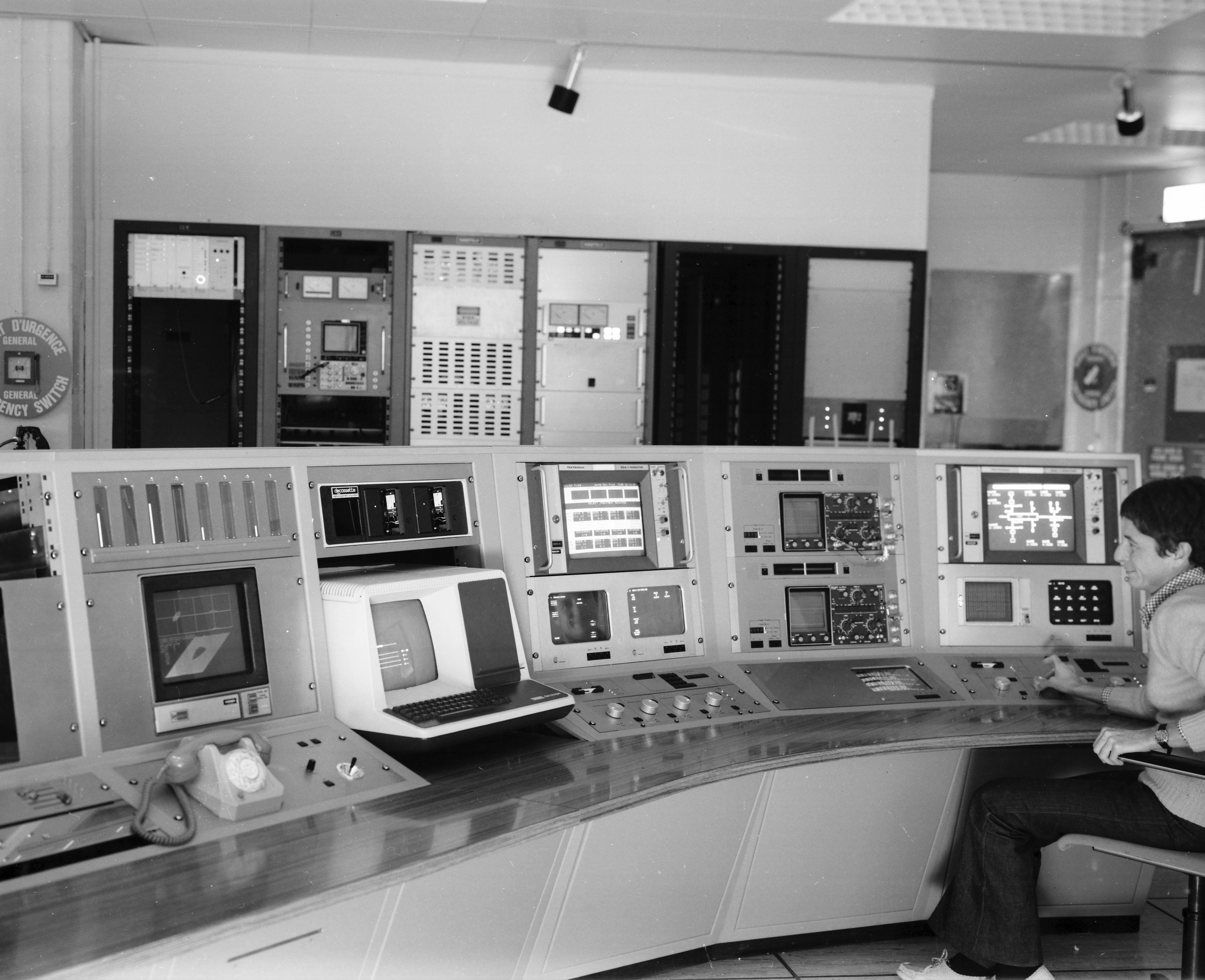
Linear accelerator
Linac 2 at CERN (1976)

== See also ==
- Command center
- Active fire protection
- Area of refuge
- Circuit integrity
- Fire protection
- Fireproofing
- Firestop
- Combat information center
- Passive fire protection
- Uninterruptible power supply
