= Greg Landsberg =

American particle physicist

- Education: SUNY Stony Brook (PhD 1994)
- Scientific career
- Fields: Particle physics
- Institutions: DØ experiment (Fermilab); Brown University; CMS (CERN)
- Academic advisors: Paul Grannis

Greg Landsberg is an American particle physicist. He is the Thomas J. Watson Sr. Professor of Physics at Brown University.

== Biography ==
Landsberg obtained his doctor of philosophy from SUNY Stony Brook in 1994, supervized by Paul Grannis. He worked at the DØ experiment at Fermilab during and after his PhD. He entered Brown University's faculty in 1998.

In 2001 Landsberg became a Alfred P. Sloan Fellow. In the same year, he wrote with Savas Dimopoulos about the generation of minuscule black holes in the Large Hadron Collider (LHC). Landsberg was also the Deputy Physics Coordinator of DØ, before he led the Brown team to join the CMS Experiment at CERN in 2004.

In 2009 he was elected a Fellow of the American Physical Society, see list and announcement by his department.

In 2010, Landsberg proposed a theory in which the universe's dimensions grow as it expands. He also participated in the search of the Higgs Boson. From 2012 to 2013, he was the Physics Coordinator at the CMS Experiment. He became the Thomas J. Watson Sr. Professor of Physics at Brown University in 2014. In 2026 he was awarded an honorary doctorate by LUT University in Finland.
