= Landsbergis =

- Lithuanian surname
- m.: Landsbergis
- f.: (unmarried): Landsbergytė
- f.: (married): Landsbergienė
- Origin: German last name "Landsberg"

Landsbergis is a Lithuanian family name. Of German origin, it is sometimes translated into Lithuanian as Žemkalnis.

Notable people with the surname include:

- Gabrielius Landsbergis-Žemkalnis (1852–1916), Lithuanian theater activist
- Vytautas Landsbergis-Žemkalnis (1893–1993), Lithuanian architect
- Vytautas Landsbergis (born 1932), Lithuanian politician, former speaker of the Seimas, member of the European Parliament
- Vytautas V. Landsbergis (born 1962), Lithuanian writer, journalist and director
- Gabrielius Landsbergis (born 1982), Lithuanian politician, member of the Seimas, former member of the European Parliament

See also

- Landsberg family
- Landsberg (disambiguation)
