= Marceli Landsberg =

Polish physician (1890–1951)

Marceli Landsberg (28 March 1890 in Tomaszów Mazowiecki – 25 June 1951 in Łódź) was a Polish physician, specialist in internal medicine and contagious diseases, and professor of the Medical Academy in Łódź.

== Family ==
The younger son of Alexander Landsberg (1859–1928), an industrialist from Tomaszów Mazowiecki, and his wife, Eleonora (1862–1942), Marceli married Maria Sachs, who bore him two daughters: Anna Haar (1921–1984) and Elizabeth Janina (b. 1925). His grandfather, Hilary Landsberg (1834–1898), was a cloth manufacturer in Tomaszów Mazowiecki who was of Sephardi descent.

== Education ==
He attended the Real-gymnasium in Piotrków Trybunalski. In 1905 he took part in school strike and was forced to leave the gymnasium. After receiving his graduation diploma in Odessa, he studied medicine in Berlin and Freiburg. In 1913, he earned doctorate in medicine "magna cum laude" on the basis of his German dissertation entitled Studien zur Lehre von der Blutgerinnung.

From 1912 to 1914 he worked as a volunteer in an internal clinics in Freiburg and Greifswald. In 1914 he received a Russian certification of his diploma in the University of Kiev.

== Professional and scientific achievement ==
During the World War I he served as a physician in the Russian Army. From 1918 to 1926 he worked as a senior assistant in the Second Internal Clinic of the University of Warsaw. From 1926 to 1934 he worked in a hospital in Warsaw, as well as in the State Hygiene Institute. From 1934 to 1939, he worked as a director of internal medicine in the Jewish hospital on Czysta Street in Warsaw.

== World War II ==
In 1939, after the outbreak of the World War II, he escaped with his wife to Lwów. He worked there a department director in a Russian hospital. In 1941–42 he was a department director in the Jewish Hospital in Lwów.

He returned to Warsaw and was forced to settle in the Warsaw Ghetto, where he was an internal medicine consultant, as well as a lecturer on courses for physicians and students. In 1942, he escaped from the ghetto with his daughters. He hid under a false name in the "Aryan" part of Warsaw. He worked as a male nurse and physician. He took part in an underground activity.

== Academics ==
After the II World War he worked as a director of a hospital in Chojny (southern district of Łódź) from 1945 to 1946, later as a director of a hospital in Radogoszcz (northern district of Lodz) in 1946–47.

In 1947 he earned his habilitation at the Medical Faculty of the University of Łódź. On 1 October 1950, he became an associate professor in the Medical Academy in Lodz, as well as a director of the Contagious Clinic in the Academy.

He died suddenly on 25 June 1951 in Łódź. He was buried in the Roman Catholic cemetery in Radogoszcz (Łódź). His younger sister, Henryka Stefańska (1900–1990), was buried in the same grave.

== Publications ==
Landsberg published more than 50 scientific publications in five European languages. A complete list of Marceli Landsberg's publications is prepared by A. Ber in 1952. He was a secretary of the Main Board of the Polish Endocrinological Association.

== See also ==
- Hilary Landsberg
- Leopold Landsberg
