= Landsberger =

Landsberger is a German surname. Notable people with the surname include:

- Benno Landsberger (1890–1968), German Assyriologist
- Mark Landsberger (born 1955), American basketball player
- Sam Landsberger (1988−2024), Australian sports journalist
- Stefan Landsberger (born 1955-2024), Dutch Sinologist

== See also ==
- Berlin Landsberger Allee station
- Landsberg (disambiguation)
