= Landsberg Castle =

Landsberg Castle may refer to:

- Landsberg Castle (Alsace), France
- Landsberg Castle (Palatinate), a ruined castle near Obermoschel, Germany
- Landsberg Castle, a ruined castle in Landsberg, Saxony-Anhalt, Germany

== See also ==
- Lanšperk Castle, in Okres Ústí nad Orlicí, Czech Republic; see William II of Pernstein
