= Ernst Landsberg =

German jurist (1860–1927)

Ernst Landsberg (12 October 1860 – 29 September 1927) was a German jurist.

He was a professor at Bonn University from 1887.

His wife was Anna Landsberg (1878–1938), and his son was Paul-Louis Landsberg (1901–1944).

== Literary works ==
- He completed "Geschichte der deutschen Rechtswissenschaft", 2 Vols., Munich, R. Oldenbourg, 1880-1910 (started by Roderich von Stintzing, 1825-83)
- Das Recht des bürgerlichen Gesetzbuchs, 1904
