= Pesticide refuge area =

Countermeasure against pesticide resistance in agriculture

A pesticide refuge area is a countermeasure against pesticide resistance in agriculture. Pesticides are used in agriculture to control weeds that encroach on crops and insects that attempt to feed upon agricultural products such as fruits and vegetables. They are vastly important in maintaining the economic, social, and environmental value of agriculture. Resistance to pesticides develops when a pesticide is used for a prolonged period of time, and severely limits its efficacy. Additionally, as more genetically engineered crops are used, there is an increased occurrence of pesticide resistance. Given that resistance develops concurrently with application and evolves through generations, the strategy of simply using or not using a particular pesticide is not efficient in limiting pesticide resistance.

In the technique of utilizing a refuge area, two adjacent pieces of agricultural land are separated, with one having pesticide applied and one not – the refuge. Using a refuge encourages the overall population to maintain a lower prevalence of resistance by segmenting them into two populations: the population receiving the pesticide and the pesticide-free population. Over time the population that receives pesticide application will evolve more widespread resistance, while the other will continue to be pesticide-free. Eventually, combining the refuge with the main population will allow the pesticide-free genetics in the refuge to more successfully reproduce within the overall area, and thus dominate the overall population.

== Steps of pesticide refuge areas ==
When creating a pesticide refuge, a physical barrier, often a screen or a cage through which a pesticide cannot pass, is placed between two groups of pests, one smaller than the other. The pests are able to pass through a gap in the cage or screen. The pesticide is then applied in the larger of the groups, separated from the other by the barrier. Resistance is a recessive trait only spread with pesticide application, so when the pesticide is applied, the trait of resistance will spread through generations, but will die off in the pesticide-free zone (the refuge). The refuge is small enough that the lack of pesticides will not harm the current crops. After multiple generations of evolution, the non-resistant pests will die off in the larger area, but will still be thriving in the refuge. The resistant and non-resident populations will mate over generations, passing down the dominant trait of vulnerability to the pesticide. The refuge strategy is based on three assumptions: the frequency of the initial alleles are low, the resistance is inherited recessively, and a large amount of mating happens between adults that are resistant from the transgenic crops and adults susceptible from the refuge, reducing the heritability of resistance.

== Uses for pesticide refuge areas/Bt-modified transgenic crops ==
Refugia are commonly used to maintain effectiveness in genetically engineered crops, known as Bt-modified transgenic crops, which are strategically evolved to resist pesticides that could harm the crops. Bt is a kind of pesticide, produced by a gene in the bacterium Bacillus thuringiensis. If pests evolve resistance, Bt-modified transgenic crops will essentially lose their efficacy. These crops are vastly important in maintaining consistent crop production, which has large economic, social, and health implications. When a refuge is used, the Bt resistance in the crops is preserved without spreading the resistance to multiple generations of pests, and the pesticide can still be used on the crop.
