= Paul Grannis =

American physicist

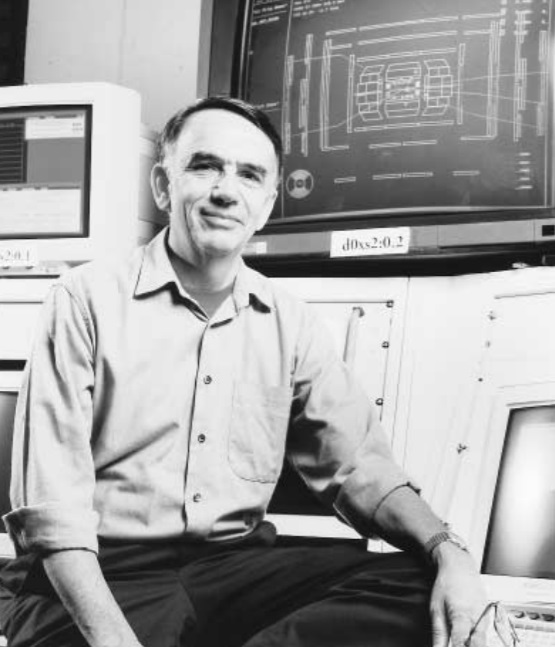
Paul Grannis in the DZero control room, 1997

Paul Dutton Grannis (26 June 1938) is an American physicist.

Grannis received the B. Eng. Phys., with Distinction, from Cornell University in 1961 and Ph.D. from University of California, Berkeley in 1965 under the supervision of Owen Chamberlain with thesis Measurement of the Polarization Parameter in Proton-Proton Scattering from 1.7 to 6.1 BeV. Since 1966 Grannis has been at Stony Brook University (SUNY at Stony Brook) where he is currently Distinguished Professor emeritus and Research Professor. He has been a visiting scientist at CERN (ISR, LEP Collider), Brookhaven National Laboratory, Fermilab, Rutherford Appleton Laboratory, University College London and Imperial College London.

In 1983, he was asked to form a collaboration to design and build a collider detector at the D0 intersection region of the Fermilab proton-antiproton collider, complementary to the planned CDF detector. As spokesman for D0 from 1983 to 1993, and co-spokesman with Hugh Montgomery from 1993 to 1996, Grannis led the D0 experiment from its inception through the end of Tevatron Run I. D0 extended our understanding of particle physics through its co-discovery with CDF of the top quark in 1995; precise measurements of the W boson mass and couplings; extensive studies of QCD using jets, gauge bosons and b-quarks; and searches for a variety of signatures of new physics. From 2014 he has again served as co-spokesperson of D0, with Dmitri Denisov.

From 2001 to 2005, Grannis was the chair of the Department of Physics and Astronomy at Stony Brook University.

Grannis worked to bring an electron positron collider capable of studying the Higgs boson and related questions regarding electroweak symmetry breaking since 1998. He has served as leader or member of the US group advocating for the linear collider (1999-2002); the International Linear Collider Steering Committee (2002-2005; 2011-2013); the panel that established the parameters and scope of the International Linear Collider (2003 and 2006); the panel that recommended the technology choice for the ILC (2003-2004); the search for the director of the Global Design Effort (2004-2005), the Linear Collider Steering Group of the Americas (2010 - 2013), and the panel to select the experimental detectors for the ILC (2008 - 2013). From 2005 to 2007 he served as Program Manager and Scientific Advisor for the Office of High Energy Physics of the US Department of Energy. Since 2013 he has served on the Americas Linear Collider Committee.

Grannis' autobiography,appeared in Annual Reviews of Nuclear and Particle Physics, 74, 1 (2024).

== Awards ==
- 1961-1965 Danforth Foundation Fellow
- 1969-1971 Alfred P. Sloan Foundation Fellow
- 1987 Fellow of the American Physical Society
- 1992 Exceptional Teaching Award, Stony Brook
- 1997 Exceptional Service Award, US Department of Energy
- 2000–2001 John S. Guggenheim Fellowship
- 2001 PPARC Fellow
- 2001 Panofsky Prize for the D0 experiment on Tevatron of Fermilab
- 2009 Honorary Doctorate from Ohio University
- 2016 Foreign member Russian Academy of Sciences
- 2019 European Physical Society High Energy Physics prize, shared with D0 collaboration for discovery of the top quark
