= Hilary Landsberg =

Cloth Manufacturer

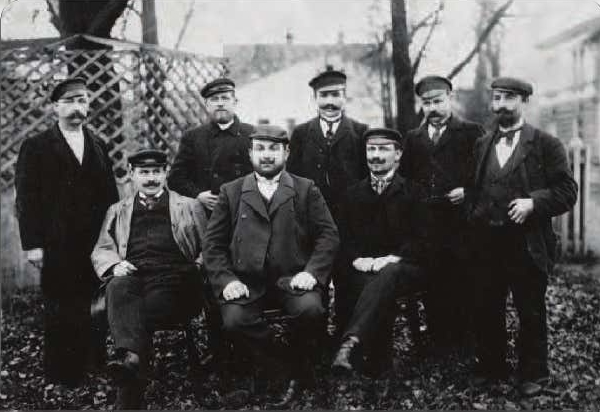
Landsberg sitting with his foremen at his factory

Hilary (Hilel) Landsberg (1834 in Warsaw, Poland – 11 January 1898 in Tomaszów Mazowiecki) was a cloth manufacturer in Tomaszów Mazowiecki.

== Family ==
Born in Warsaw in a Jewish family of Sephardi origin, Landsberg was descended from Salomon Calahorra, the royal physician of two kings of Poland: Sigismund II Augustus and Stephen Báthory. Hilel was the son of Mendel Lewkowicz Landsberg, a tradesman in Warsaw, and Lea née Lewek. He was a founder of the Tomaszow branch of the Landsbergs. His younger brothers Abram Lajb vel Alexander Landsberg (1859–1928) and Leopold vel Liber Landsberg (1861–1935) were owners of factories in Tomaszów Mazowiecki and Łódź, respectively.

Hilary Landsberg married Hana Mendelsburg (1838–1904) and had two sons Alexander (Abram Lajb) (1858–1924) and Felix (Fishel) (1868–1923), and six daughters.

== Industrial activity ==
In 1857, Landsberg started a small cloth-manufacturing business in Tomaszów Mazowiecki with ten hand-looms. Step by step he modernized the means of production. In 1881–1883 he constructed a large textile factory in the town (Gustowna street 46), introducing steam power. In 1894 he built a finish-work factory and a wool warehouse. In 1896, he electrified his factory. Landsberg employed more than 300 workers in the factory.

== See also ==
- Marceli Landsberg

== Bibliography ==
- Kazimierz Badziak, Awans przemysłowy Tomaszowa Maz. do II wojny światowej i jego najważniejsi twórcy, in: Wiesława Bogurat (ed.), "220 lat Tomaszowa Mazowieckiego". Materiały sesji naukowej 16 września 2008 r., Tomaszów Mazowiecki 2008, pp. 24–25. (in Polish)
- Joanna Podolska, Spacerownik. Śladami Żydów ziemi łódzkiej, ISBN 978-83-268-0036-8, Agora SA, Łódź 2010, p. 138. (in Polish)
- Krzysztof Tomasz Witczak, Słownik biograficzny Żydów tomaszowskich [The Biographical Dictionary of Jews from Tomaszów Mazowiecki], Łódź - Tomaszów Mazowiecki 2010: Wydawnictwo Uniwersytetu Łódzkiego, pp. 150–151. (in Polish)
