= Eddie Landsberg =

American jazz musician

Eddie Landsberg (born October 2, 1971) is a jazz organist.

His first CD, Remembering Eddie Jefferson, featured bebop vocalist Giacomo Gates and James Spaulding.
