= Paul-Louis Landsberg =

German-Jewish philosopher (1901–1944)

- Portrait of Landsberg
- Born: 3 December 1901
- Died: 2 April 1944 (aged 42)

Philosophical work
- Era: 20th-century philosophy
- Region: Western Philosophy

Paul-Louis Landsberg (3 December 1901 – 2 April 1944) was a German existentialist philosopher who is known for his works The Experience of Death and The Moral Problem of Suicide.

Landsberg lectured at the Universities of Bonn, Madrid and Paris, among others. He was a pupil of Martin Heidegger, Edmund Husserl and Max Scheler, continuing their work in Phenomenology to tackle several vital subjects, including personal identity, death and suicide. He was a close friend of the Christian Existentialist Emmanuel Mounier and a key contributor to the philosophical journal Esprit (1913-2013).

Landsberg was hounded by the Gestapo for most of his life, both because of his Jewish family background and due to his expression of Anti-Nazi sentiments. He was captured by the Gestapo and deported to Oranienburg concentration camp towards the end of the war and died there of physical and mental exhaustion in April 1944.

== Early life and education ==
Paul-Louis Landsberg was born on 3 December 1901 at Bonn into a large, wealthy Jewish family, the son of the prominent German Jurist Ernst Landsberg and his wife Anna. His parents had him baptized as a Protestant but later on he turned towards Catholicism and allied himself with the Benedictine liturgical movement centered around Maria Laach. He was a pupil of the phenomenological philosophers Edmund Husserl, Martin Heidegger (in Freiburg) and Max Scheler. Though he studied with the latter-most in Cologne, he moved back to his birth-town to become Professor of Philosophy at the University of Bonn.

However, due to his opposition to Nazism, he fled Germany just before the coming to power of Adolf Hitler in 1933. By the beginning of March 1933, he had emigrated to Spain and began teaching Philosophy there. During this period he was studying the Mystics of the 16th century. Between 1934 and 1936, he held positions at the Complutense University of Madrid and the University of Barcelona, where his thought began to exert a great influence over his pupils, and where it is still studied avidly to this day.

== Paris and Esprit ==
With the coming of the Civil War in Spain, Landsberg transferred to Paris where he began giving courses at the University of the Sorbonne on the Meaning of Existence. It was at this time that he also became deeply involved with the journal Esprit (1913-2013) through which channel his thought gradually became disseminated.

Landsberg became close friends with the Personalist philosopher Emmanuel Mounier, whose themes bore a similarity to those explored in his own works. A friend of Max Scheler's, and a disciple of some of his Phenomenological techniques, Mounier was, like Landsberg, a Christian. Along with Gabriel Marcel these were probably the most significant 'Christian Existentialists'.

== Capture and death ==
For a long time, Landsberg was persecuted by the Gestapo and it was clear that they were intent on having him put away, if not least for his Anti-Nazist views but also for his essentially Jewish parentage. First his wife Madeleine was taken captive by the Nazis and he spent a long odyssey cycling from town to town in France, both so as to escape from the German Army and in order to find her. He succeeded in joining an Anti-Nazi military group which provided him with official papers, enabling him to take shelter at several locations (Vendôme, Orléans, Lyon) yet always without any news of his wife. The group of the Esprit journal managed to see to the safe storage of some of his works and place him safely (for a moment) at the Psychiatric Asylum in Pau, where he was afforded some recovery from the trauma of being separated from his wife and being detained temporarily by the Nazis.

Ultimately, Jacques Thérond, who headed the 'groupe Esprit' installed Landsberg at a hotel with papers under the name of 'Richert'. Against all odds he succeeded in finding his wife, joined a local combat group and evaded anti-semitic persecution for some time. However, in March 1943 he was arrested as a Resistance fighter and as being of Jewish origin. He was deported to the concentration camp at Oranienburg, outside Berlin and is recorded as having died of exhaustion on 2 April 1944 while still incarcerated.

== Work and influence ==
Landsberg's work is, like Mounier's and the other Existentialists, personal in tone. He is not interested in philosophy as a theoretical discipline but as an exploration of Conscience and the individual's personal confrontation with their own life and death. His deeply searching attitude to the questions of philosophy comes out very clearly in the opening words of his most important and influential work The Experience of Death : "What is the meaning of death to the human being as a person? The question admits of no conclusion, for we are dealing with the very mystery of man, taken from a certain aspect. Every real problem in philosophy contains all the others in the unity of mystery". His approach to understanding these issues is to look for an answer within experience, and he goes on to say: "It is necessary, therefore, to set a limit and seek a basis in experience for any possible answer".

Landsberg's influence has been particularly marked on euthanasia groups as his work 'The Moral Problem of Suicide' provides a Christian approach to suicide which condones it instead of condemning it, and provides philosophical support for this view in arguing against traditional Catholic polemics on the topic. For a reader new to Landsberg, probably the most significant extract from his work is Chapter VIII. of his book The Experience of Death entitled "Intermezzo in the Bull Ring", where he creates an analogy between the life of any individual man and the struggle of the matador with the bull in the course of a bull-fight. Like Plato in his 'Allegory of the Cave' Landsberg has managed to make a deep reflection on life through a process of analogy. Through being more concrete in his description he enables the reader to visualize and understand what he is talking about with greater ease.

Though the two key works above have been translated into English, they had been out of publication for several decades before their republication by Living Time World Thought in 2001. According to their website The Academy of the 3rd Millennium (A3M) is publishing The Essence and Meaning of the Platonic Academy as the introductory essay for a volume of Platonic Dialogues on the topic of education in April 2014. For an example of the discussion of Landsberg's contribution to the philosophy of death in recent literature see Death and Mortality in Contemporary Philosophy by Bernard N. Schumacher (2010). For an instance of his influence on Phenomenology see the Phenomenology of Life - From the Animal Soul to the Human Mind. For an account of his impact on bio-ethics, see the book The Least Worst Death: Essays in Bioethics on the End of Life by M. Pabst Battin.

== Select bibliography ==
- The Essence and Meaning of the Platonic Academy (1923)
- The Vocation of Pascal (1927)
- Introduction to Philosophical Anthropology (1934)
- The Conception of the Person (Essay in Esprit, 1934)
- The Experience of Death (1937)
- The Moral Problem of Suicide (1937)
- The Philosophy of St.Augustine (1944)
- Machiavelli, A Study (1944)
