= Area of refuge =

Location in a building designed to hold occupants during a fire or other emergency

An area of refuge or safe room is a place in a building designed to hold occupants during a fire or other emergency when evacuation may not be safe or possible. Occupants can wait there until rescued or relieved by firefighters.

In some instances, an area of refuge or refuge area may refer to a designated space in a multi-unit residential building that can provide relief from unsafe or uncomfortable conditions in individual units.

== Beneficiaries ==
People who use refuge areas may include:

- Those who cannot reach a safe escape route
- Those assisting people who are prevented from escaping
- Hospital patients
- Sick people
- People with disabilities
- Elderly people
- Very young children and infants
- Medical personnel who may be operating on a patient at the time of the emergency
- Operators in a critical facility whose function must not be interrupted, such as nuclear power stations, key military fortifications, and high security prisons

== Technical requirements ==
An area of refuge is typically supplied with a steady supply of fresh or filtered outside air.

A two way communication system is provided on each floor above or below the main floor. A call box is required in each area of refuge, which can call into a central location called a base station. If the station is not attended 24 hours a day, the call must automatically call to an outside location and have two-way voice person to person communication capabilities.

== Typical areas of refuge ==
- Stairwells (also to allow egress unimpeded by smoke)
- Control rooms in nuclear power stations, chemical plants, and high security prisons
- Operating theaters

Such locations are usually required to be bounded by fire-resistant walls and floors.

== Other uses of refuge areas ==
In the context of climate change, where older buildings may not be designed for changing climate conditions, refuge spaces are sometimes discussed in terms of providing communal areas in multi-unit buildings for when temperature and air quality is not safe or comfortable in individual units.

== See also ==
- Safe room/panic room

== Bibliography ==
- Roberts, Jessica L (2005). "An area of refuge: due process analysis and emergency evacuation for people with disabilities". Virginia Journal of Social Policy & the Law. 13 (127).
