= Landsberg family =

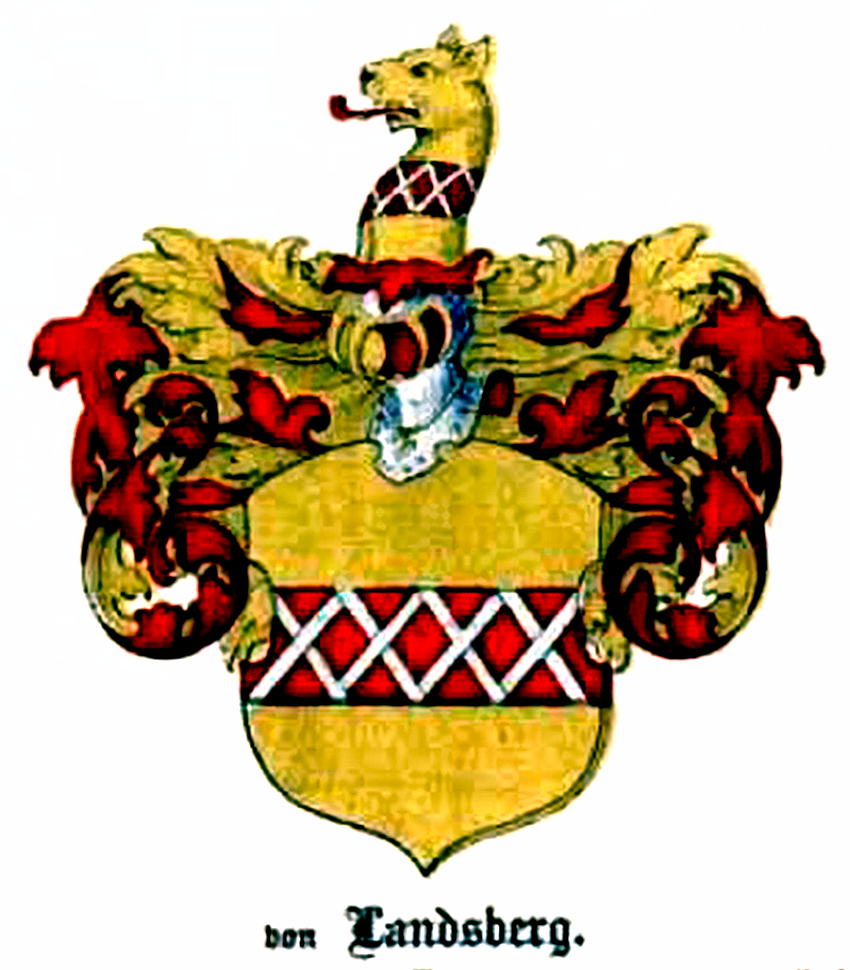
Coat of arms of the Landsberg family

The Landsberg family is a German noble family originating from the Westphalia, whose members settled in Courland and later in Lithuania and Poland.

== History ==
The earliest mention of the family dates back to the 11th century, they trace their roots to a ministerialis who lived in 1055 at the Werden Abbey. Their last name comes the Landsberg Castle in the Duchy of Berg, which was still in the hands of the German representatives of the family in the 20th century. Two members of the family, Wilhelm von Landsberg and Johann von Landsberg, arrived in Courland in the 16th century, where they received the fief estate of Wiexeln. Wilhelm's male descendants lived in Courland until 1820.

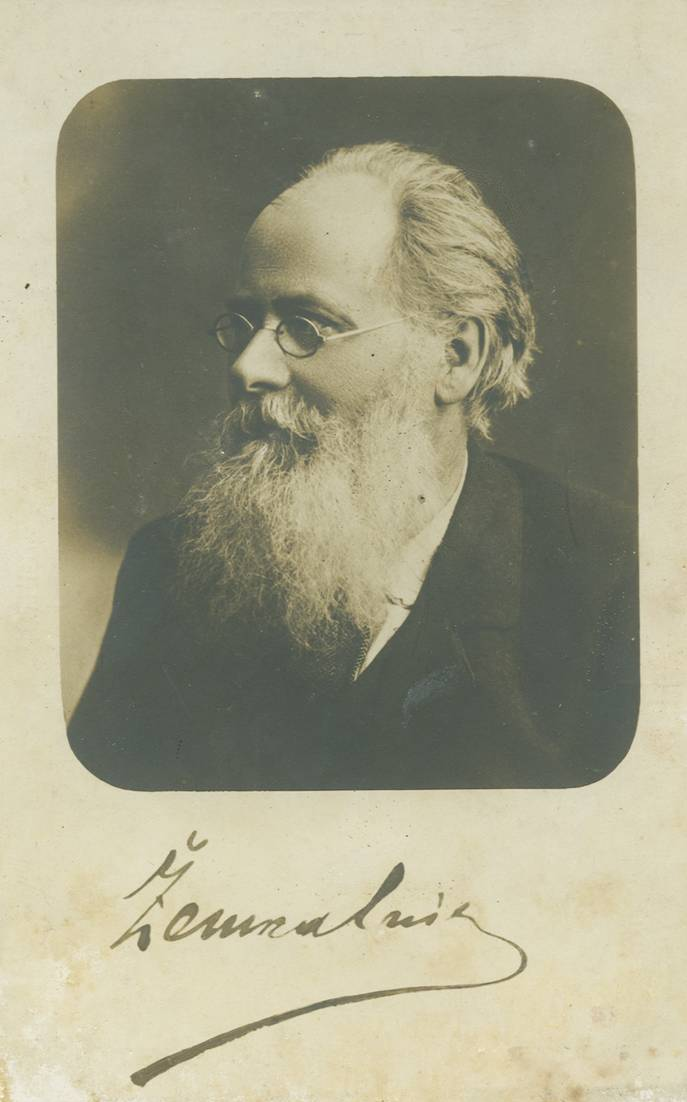
Gabrielius Landsbergis-Žemkalnis

Johann von Landsberg's descendant, Eduard Eberhard (Ewarni) Landsberg (1625–1652) settled in Lithuania where he acquired the estates in the Vilnius voivodeship. Johann had one son Georg, who in turn had two sons Rafał (born 1715) and Bogusław (born 1717), both of whom left numerous offspring. The family sprawled out and did not play a major role in local politics, nor was it characterized by great wealth, holding several, often divided estates in Lithuania and Samogitia: Albertava, Linkuva, Triškoniai, Vengriškis, Juodeikiai and others. Only Tomasz, great-grandson of Rafał Landsberg, who married Marcjanella Kierbedź, came to greater prominence. His son Stanisław married Salomea Szemiot, through which he came into possession of the large estate of Šiaulėnai. The second of Tomasz's sons Wacław owned Klėriškės married Malwina Römer, through which he came into possession of Triliškės. Only then did the Landsbergs become a substantial landowning family. Wacław's son was Emil Landsberg, a railroad engineer.

Another prominent representative of the family was Gabrielius Landsbergis-Žemkalnis, an activist in the Lithuanian National Revival. He came from the impoverished part of the family; his father was Wincenty Ananiasz, son of Kazimierz Ignacy and grandson of mentioned earlier Rafał Landsberg. The descendants of Gabrielius and his brother Kazimierz were prominent figures in the Lithuanian state. Gabrielius' grandson Vytautas Landsbergis was a leader in 1988 of the Lithuanian independence movement Sąjūdis.

== See also ==
- Landsberg, list of people with the surname

== Bibliography ==
- Błaszczyk, Grzegorz (2018). "Landsbergowie: Niemcy, Polacy i Litwini". Inter Regnum et Ducatum. Studia ofiarowane Profesorowi Janowi Tęgowskiemu w siedemdziesiątą rocznicę urodzin.
