= Leopold Landsberg =

Polish industrialist (1861–1935)

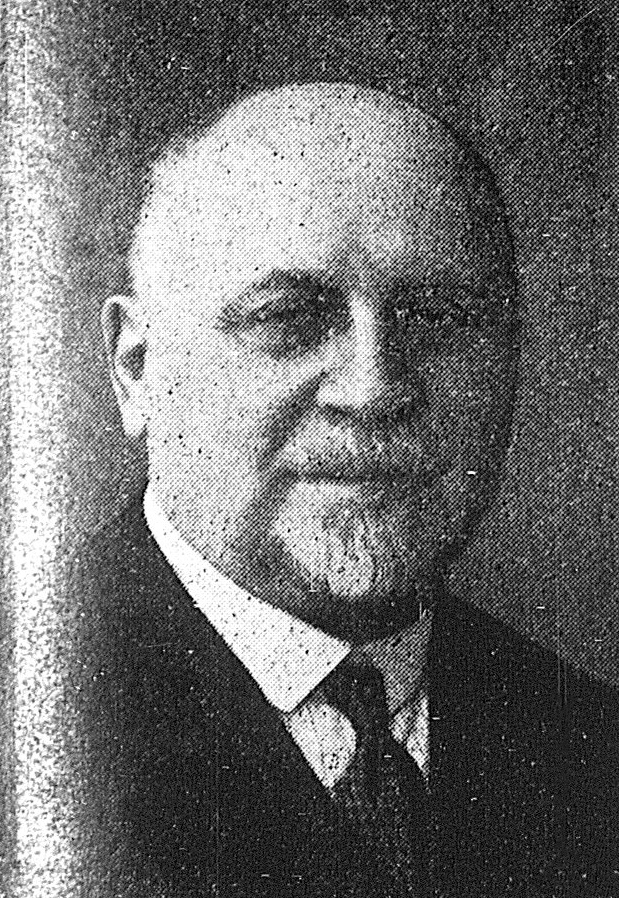
Leopold Landsberg (1933)

Leopold vel Liber Landsberg (10 June 1861 in Warsaw, Congress Poland, Russian Empire – 4 June 1935 in Łódź, Poland) was a Polish industrialist in the Russian Empire and then Poland.

== Early life and career ==
He was the youngest son of Mendel Landsberg, a tradesman in Warsaw, and Laia Lewin. His elder brethren Hilary Landsberg (1834–1898) and Alexander Landsberg (1859–1928) were clothing manufacturers in Tomaszów Mazowiecki.

In 1885, Leopold Landsberg settled in Łódź and opened his factory (at Lonkowa Street), producing female clothing. By World War I, goods were selling to Russian markets. In 1905, as many as 70 workers were employed in his factory. He was a treasurer of the Union of the Łódź Manufacturers. He belonged to the owners of the Joint-Stock Company of Cloth Factories in Tomaszów Mazowiecki.

After World War I, Leopold Landsberg's factory called "the Mechanical Weaving Mill of Wool Products" (in Polish "Tkalnia Mechaniczna Wyrobów Wełnianych") was at Srodmiejska Street and made many woollen goods for the domestic market.

He was a president of the Jewish Association for Caring of the Sick, Bykur Cholim.

He died in Łódź and was buried in the Jewish Cemetery at Bracka Street Łódź (left side, section D, tomb No. 107). His wife Sara (Sura) Salomea Hirschberg (1861–1944), daughter of Yehuda and Rayzla née Birnbaum, was buried in the neighbouring grave (No. 106).

== Bibliography ==
- Andrzej Kempa, Marek Szukalak, The Biographical Dictionary of the Jews from Lodz, Lodz 2006: Oficyna Bibliofilów and Fundacja Monumentum Iudaicum Lodzense, ISBN 83-87522-83-X, pp. 149–150 (Leopold Landsberg's biographical note).
