= DØ experiment =

Particle physics research project (1983–2011)

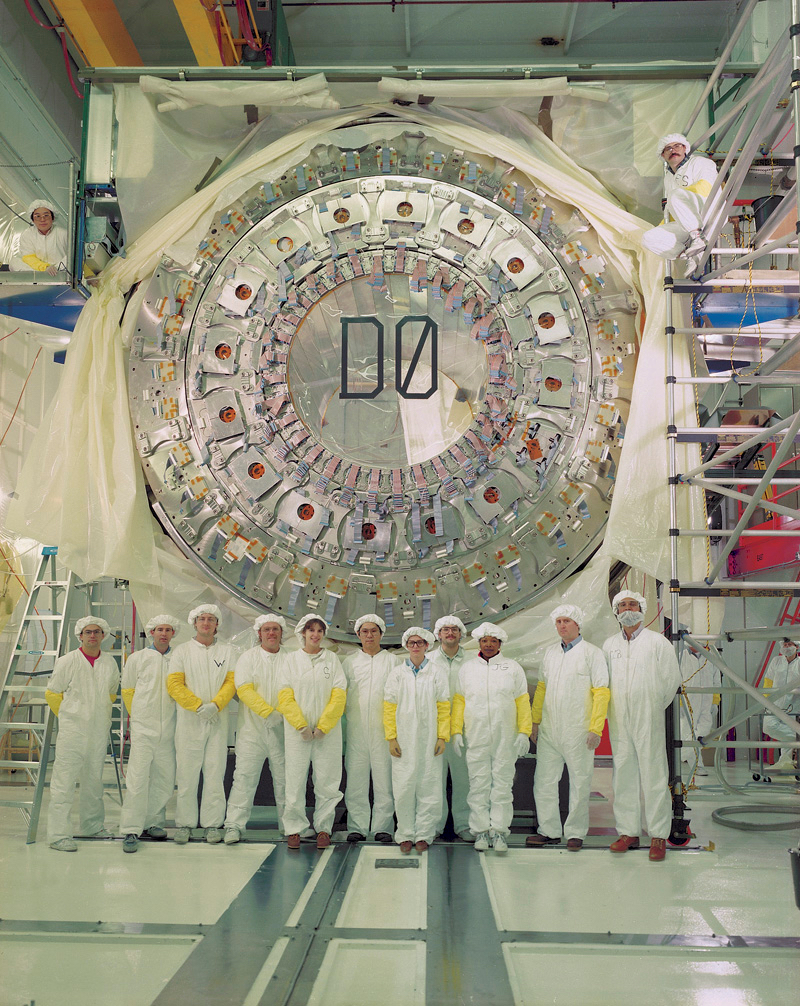
DØ Central Calorimeter under construction at Fermilab

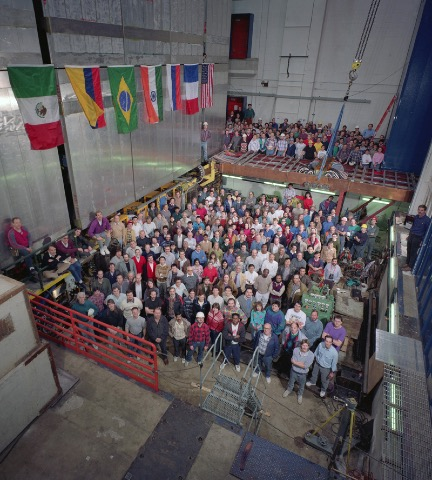
The DØ Collaboration in February 1992.

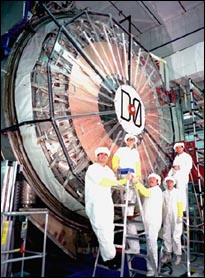
DØ under construction, the installation of the central tracking system

The D0︀ experiment (DZero experiment, often stylized as DØ experiment) was a worldwide collaboration of scientists conducting research on the fundamental nature of matter. DØ was one of two major experiments (the other was the CDF experiment) located at the Tevatron Collider at Fermilab in Batavia, Illinois. The Tevatron was the world's highest-energy accelerator from 1983 until 2009, when its energy was surpassed by the Large Hadron Collider. The DØ experiment stopped taking data in 2011, when the Tevatron shut down, but data analysis is still occurring. The DØ detector is preserved in Fermilab's DØ Assembly Building as part of a historical exhibit for public tours.

DØ research was focused on precise studies of interactions of protons and antiprotons at the highest available energies. These collisions result in "events" containing many new particles created through the transformation of energy into mass according to the relation E=mc^{2}. The research involves an intense search for subatomic clues that reveal the character of the building blocks of the universe.

== Overview ==
In 1981, Fermilab director Leon M. Lederman asked for preliminary proposals for a "modest detector built by a modestly sized group" that would be located at the 'DØ' interaction region in the Tevatron ring and complement the planned Collider Detector at Fermilab. More than fifteen groups submitted proposals. Three of these proposals were merged into one effort under the leadership of Paul Grannis, which officially began on July 1, 1983. The group produced a design report in November 1984. The detector was completed in 1991, it was placed in the Tevatron in February 1992, and observed its first collision in May 1992. It recorded data from 1992 until 1996, when it was shut down for major upgrades. Its second run began in 2001 and lasted until September 2011. As of 2019, data analysis is still going on.

The DØ experiment was an international collaboration that, at its peak, included about 650 physicists from 88 universities and national laboratories from 21 countries. It studied the collisions between the protons and antiprotons circulating in the Tevatron to test many aspects of the Standard Model of particle physics.

The DØ detector consisted of several nested subdetector groups surrounding the region where the beam protons and antiprotons collided. The subdetectors provided over a million channels of electronics that were collected, digitized and logged for off-line analyses. About 10 million collisions of the proton and antiproton beams were inspected every second, and up to 500 collisions per second were recorded for further studies.

== Physics research ==
DØ conducted its scientific studies within six physics groups: Higgs, Top, Electroweak, New Phenomena, QCD, and B Physics. Significant advances were made in each of them.

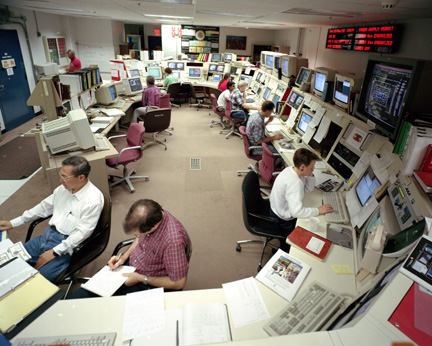
DØ's control room

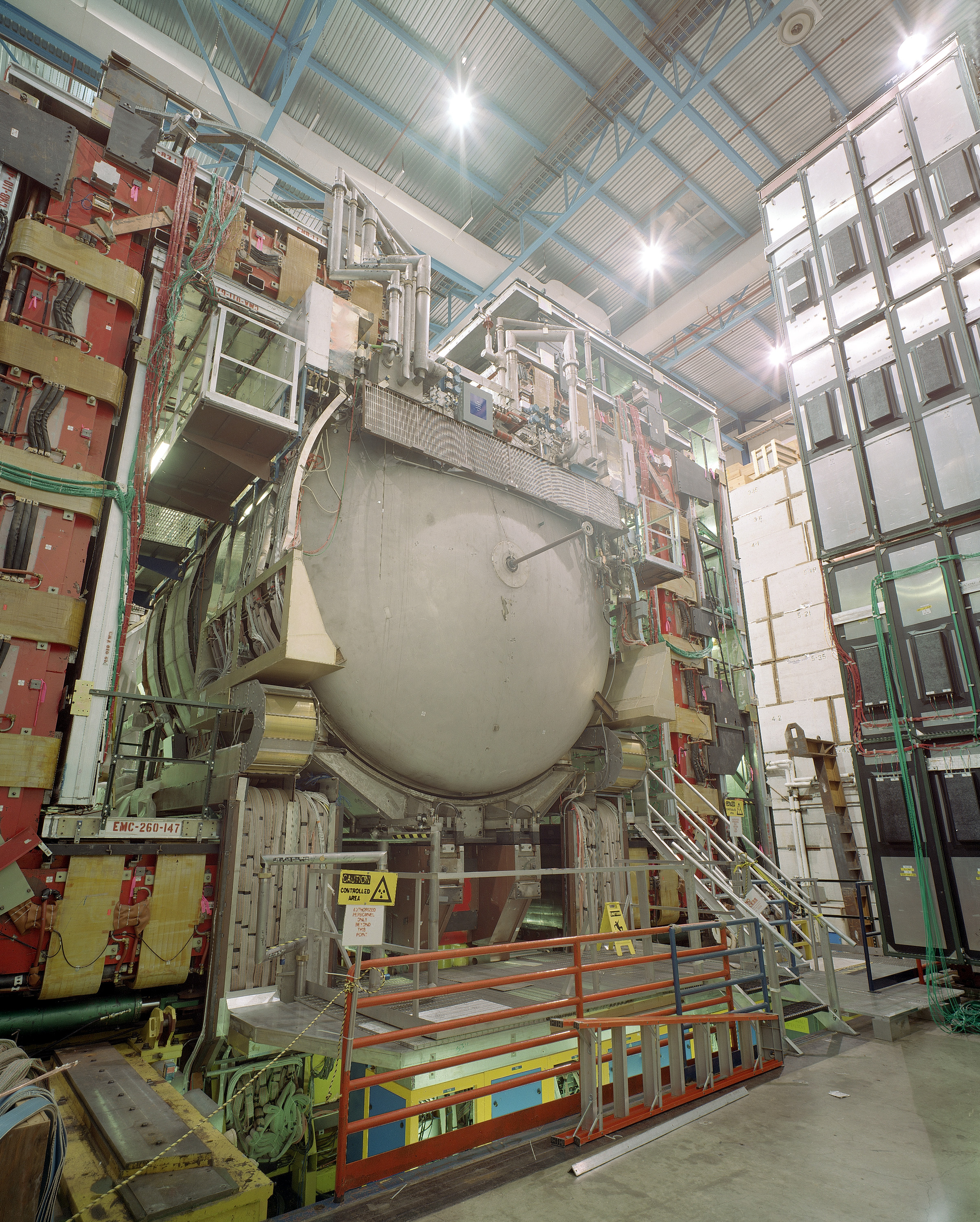
DØ Detector with large liquid argon calorimeter

=== Top quark ===
One of the early goals of the DØ experiment was to discover the top quark, the last of the six constituents of matter predicted by the Standard Model of particle physics. The DØ and CDF experiments both collected data for the search, but they used different observation and analysis techniques that allowed independent confirmation of one another's findings.

On February 24, 1995, DØ and CDF submitted research papers to Physical Review Letters describing the observation of top and antitop quark pairs produced via the strong interaction. On March 2, 1995, the two collaborations jointly reported the discovery of the top quark at a mass of about 175 GeV/c^{2} (nearly that of a gold nucleus).

On March 4, 2009, the DØ and CDF collaborations both announced the discovery of the production of single top quarks via the weak interaction. This process occurs at about half the rate as the production of top quark pairs but is much more difficult to observe since it is more difficult to distinguish from background processes that can create false signals. The single top quark studies were used to measure the top quark lifetime of about 5 × 10^{−25} seconds, measure the last unknown element of the CKM matrix of quark inter-generational mixing, and to search for new physics beyond the Standard Model.

Precision measurements of top quark properties such as mass, charge, decay modes, production characteristics, and polarization were reported in over one hundred publications.

The European Physical Society awarded the 2019 High Energy and Particle Physics Prize to the DØ and CDF collaborations "for the discovery of the top quark and the detailed measurement of its properties."

- DØ's top-quark physics group's home page

=== Higgs boson ===
In later years, one of the main physics goals of the DØ experiment was the search for the Higgs boson, which was predicted to exist by the Standard Model, but with an unknown mass. Before they concluded in 2000, the LEP experiments at CERN had ruled out the existence of such a Higgs boson with a mass smaller than 114.4 GeV/c^{2}. In 2010 DØ and CDF extended the forbidden region to include a window around 160 GeV/c^{2}.

On July 2, 2012, anticipating an announcement from CERN of the discovery of the Higgs boson, the DØ and CDF collaborations announced their evidence (at about three standard deviations) for Higgs bosons decaying into the dominant b quark final states, which indicated that the particle had a mass between 115 and 135 GeV/c^{2}. On July 4, 2012, CERN's ATLAS and CMS experiments announced their discovery of the Higgs boson with a mass of 125 GeV/c^{2}.

The techniques developed at the Tevatron for the Higgs boson searches served as a springboard for subsequent LHC analyses.

=== W and Z bosons ===
The properties of the W and Z bosons that transmit the weak nuclear force are sensitive indicators of the internal consistency of the Standard Model. In 2012, DØ measured the W boson mass to a relative precision of better than 0.03%, ruling out many potential models of new physics.

The DØ and CDF experiments combined to measure the forward-backward asymmetry in the decays of Z bosons (the tendency of positive decay leptons to emerge closer to the incoming proton direction more often than negative decay leptons). From these asymmetry measurements, the weak mixing angle governing the breaking of the electroweak symmetry into distinct electromagnetic and weak forces was measured to a precision of better than 0.15%. This result has comparable precision to electron positron collider experiments at CERN and SLAC and helps to resolve a long-standing tension between those measurements.

=== Bottom and charm quarks ===
Although the B-factory experiments at KEK, SLAC and IHEP in Beijing and the LHCb experiment at CERN have dominated many aspects of the study of hadrons containing b- or c-quarks, DØ has made notable contributions using large samples containing all heavy flavor hadrons that can be seen through their decays to muons.

In July 2006, the DØ collaboration published the first evidence for the transformation of the B_{s} meson (containing an anti-b quark and a strange quark) into its antiparticle. The transition occurs about 20 trillion times per second. If there were new particles beyond those in the Standard Model, this rate would have been modified.

On May 14, 2010, the DØ collaboration announced a tendency for b and anti-b quarks produced in proton-antiproton collisions to lead to a pair of positively charged muons more frequently than a negatively charged pair. This tendency, together with measurements of single muon asymmetries, could help explain the matter-antimatter asymmetry responsible for the dominance of matter in the universe. Experimental results from physicists at the Large Hadron Collider, however, have suggested that "the difference from the Standard Model is insignificant."

On June 12, 2007, the DØ collaboration submitted a paper to Physical Review Letters announcing the discovery of a new particle called the Ξ_{b} (pronounced "zigh sub b") with a mass of 5.774±0.019 GeV/c^{2}, approximately six times the mass of a proton. The Ξ_{b} baryon is made of a down, a strange and a bottom quark, making it the first observed baryon formed of quarks from all three generations of matter.

The original quark hypotheses by Murray Gell-Mann and George Zweig noted that exotic mesons containing two quarks and two antiquarks (instead of just a quark and antiquark) are possible. Examples were finally observed 40 years later in cases where the exotic meson contains the more distinctive heavy b- and c-quarks. DØ has contributed new understanding of these heavy flavor exotic states.

=== Strong force ===
Quantum chromodynamics (QCD) is the theory of the strong interaction, in which quarks and gluons interact through a quantum property, analogous to electric charge for electromagnetism, called "color." QCD makes quantitative predictions for the production of jets (collimated sprays of particles evolved from scattered quarks or gluons), photons and W or Z bosons.

In 1999 – 2001, DØ published a series of papers investigating jet production as a function of beam energy, jet energy, and jet production angle. The measurement of the central inclusive jet cross section was followed by the measurement of the pseudorapidity and transverse-energy dependence of the inclusive jet production cross section, the measurement of the ratio of central inclusive jet cross sections at two center-of-mass energies, and a review article covering additionally the measurements of the dijet mass spectrum and the dijet angular distributions.

A result in 2012 from DØ was the measurement of very high energy jets produced at large scattering angles. This occurs when single quarks carry more than half of the energy of their parent proton or antiproton, despite the fact that the proton and antiproton are typically built from dozens of quarks and gluons. The measurement was in excellent agreement with predictions. In a series of publications in which two pairs of jets or photons stemming from two independent scatterings of quarks and gluons within a single proton-antiproton encounter were observed, the pattern of these rates indicated that the spatial extent of gluons within the proton is smaller than that for quarks.

== Detector ==
The DØ detector consisted of several "sub-detectors," which were grouped into three shells surrounding the collision point. The innermost shell was the Central Tracking System consisting of tracking detectors enclosed in a superconducting magnet. These were surrounded by a second shell consisting of calorimeters that measured the energy of electrons, photons, and hadrons and identified "jets" of particles arising from scattered quarks and gluons. The third shell, the muon system, had tracking chambers and scintillator panels before and after magnetized solid iron magnets to identify muons. The whole detector was enclosed behind a concrete block wall which acted as radiation shields. The detector measured about 10m × 10m × 20m and weighed about 5,500 tons. It is preserved in Fermilab's DØ Assembly Building as part of a public historical exhibit.

=== Central Tracking System ===
The central tracking system had two subdetectors for measuring charged particle track positions and a magnetic field to cause tracks to bend, thereby allowing a measurement of their momenta.

The silicon microstrip tracker was located just outside the Tevatron beam pipes. Five barrels concentric with the beams and 16 disks with strips perpendicular to the beams provided precision measurements of charged track coordinates. These helped to determine particle momenta and to distinguish those particles that emerged from the primary collision point from those that traveled a finite distance before decaying, like tau leptons and hadrons containing bottom quarks. It consisted of about 800,000 silicon strips of 50 micron width, capable of measuring track location to about 10 microns. The outer radius of the silicon detectors was limited to 10 cm due to their high cost. The silicon microstrip tracker was installed in the detector for the Tevatron Run II collider program, which began in 2001. It was fully functional by April 2002.

Outside the silicon tracker, the cylindrical scintillating fiber tracker occupied the radial region between 20 and 52 cm and 2.5 m along the beam line. Particles traversed eight layers of 835 micron diameter scintillating fibers. These fibers produced photons when a particle passed through them. Light from each of the more than 75,000 fibers was transmitted to solid state sensors that created electronic signals that were digitized and logged. The fiber tracker spatial precision was about 100 microns.

A superconducting solenoid magnet was located just outside the fiber tracker created a 2 T magnetic field in the silicon and fiber tracker volume.

=== Calorimeter ===
The calorimeter system consisted of three sampling calorimeters (a cylindrical Central Calorimeter and two End Calorimeters), an intercryostat detector, and a preshower detector. The job of the calorimeters and associated subdetectors was the measurement of energies of electrons, photons, and charged and neutral hadrons. This was achieved when incident particles traversed multiple layers of dense inert material in which they interacted and created secondary particles. All such secondary particles are called a shower. The energy of the progenitor particle was shared among many shower particles of much lower energy that ultimately stopped, at which point the shower ended. Between the layers of the inert material there were detectors in which the ionization of the particles was measured. The total ionization signal summed over the shower is proportional to the energy of the progenitor particle.

A cylindrical layer of scintillator-based preshower strips was placed immediately outside the solenoid and read out with fiber tracker sensors. Similar preshower detectors capped the ends of the tracking region. The material in the solenoid augmented with lead sheets caused primary electrons and photons to begin a shower of secondary particles. The preshower detector was thus the first stage of the calorimetry and gave a precise location of the particle impact point.

A central calorimeter outside and two end calorimeters capping the solenoid contained separate sections for measuring electromagnetic particles and hadrons. Uranium was chosen for the inert absorber plates owing to its very high density. The active gaps contained liquid argon with a strong electric field applied to collect the ionization of traversing particles on finely segmented planes of copper electrodes. These signals were ganged into 50,000 signals that measured the particle energies and the transverse and longitudinal shower shapes which helped identify the particle type. Each calorimeter contained about sixty uranium-liquid argon modules with a total weight of 240 to 300 metric tons. The total thickness of a calorimeter was about 175 cm so as to fully absorb the showers of the most energetic particles from a collision. The stainless steel vessels needed to contain the modules at liquid argon temperature (-190 C) were relatively thick, so scintillation detectors were inserted between central and end calorimeters to correct for energy lost in the cryostat walls.

A primary task for the calorimetry is identification of jets, the sprays of particles created as quarks and gluons escape from their collision point. Jet identification and measurement of their directions and energies allow analyses to recreate the momenta of the underlying quarks and gluons in the primary collision.

=== Muon Detector ===
The outermost shell of the detector was for muon detection. High energy muons are quite rare and are thus a telltale sign of interesting collisions. Unlike most particles, they did not get absorbed in the calorimeters, so tracks observed beyond the calorimeters were most likely muons. Scintillator planes provided a fast signature used to flag interesting events. One station of tracking chambers before and two stations after solid iron magnets record the muon tracks. The iron of the large central magnet was reclaimed from a NASA cyclotron built to simulate radiation damage in space.

== Trigger and DAQ ==
Approximately 10 million proton-antiproton collisions happened every second in the detector. Because this far exceeded computing capabilities, only a fraction of these events could be stored on tape per second. Therefore, an intricate Data Acquisition (DAQ) system was implemented that determined which events were "interesting" enough to be written to tape and which could be thrown out. The trigger system used the electronic signals to identify events of interest, such as those containing electrons, muons, photons, high energy jets, or particles that traveled some distance before decaying. The first trigger level used the fast electronic signals from each subdetector to decide within a few microseconds whether to pause data-taking and digitize the signals. About 10,000 such Level 1 triggers were accepted. A second trigger level refined the selection using the digitized signals from several subdetectors in combination to form a more nuanced event profile, reducing the candidate event pool to 1000 events per second. In the third level, a farm of computers analyzed the digital information in a stripped-down version of the full offline computer code to yield up to 100 events per second to be permanently recorded and subsequently analyzed on large offline computer farms. The operation of the trigger system was a delicate balance between maximizing the number of events saved and minimizing the dead time incurred while collecting them. It had to be robust and reliable, as the millions of events not selected by the trigger were lost forever.
