= List of hypothetical particles =

This is a list of hypothetical particles.

Hypothetical particles are proposed subatomic or composite entities arising in theoretical particle physics and cosmology that have not been experimentally confirmed. They are typically introduced to address limitations of the Standard Model, unify fundamental interactions, or explain unresolved observations such as dark matter, neutrino masses, baryon asymmetry, or cosmic inflation. Many are mathematically well defined within quantum field theory or its extensions and serve as mediators or constituents in speculative but testable frameworks beyond the Standard Model.

Prominent classes include gauge or symmetry-related particles such as the graviton or graviphoton in quantum gravity and extra-dimensional theories, and supersymmetric partners (e.g., neutralinos or charginos) predicted by supersymmetry. Others address specific phenomena, including hidden-sector bosons such as dark photons or light force carriers proposed to explain nuclear anomalies.

Hypothetical particles also encompass predicted bound states (e.g., glueballs), topological objects such as magnetic monopoles, and unconventional statistical entities such as anyons or tachyons. Collectively, they form a central component of theoretical model building, guiding experimental searches for physics beyond currently known particles.

== Elementary particles ==
Some theories predict the existence of additional elementary bosons and fermions that are not found in the Standard Model.

Hypothetical bosons and fermions
Name	Spin	Notes
axion	0	A pseudoscalar particle introduced in Peccei–Quinn theory to solve the strong-CP problem.
curvaton	0	Scalar force-carrier that is presumed to have physically caused oscillations during cosmic inflation.
dilaton	0	Predicted in some string theories.
graviphoton	1	Also known as "gravivector". It appears in Kaluza–Klein theory.
graviton	2	Massless boson associated to gravitation. Included in many beyond the Standard Model theories.
dual graviton	2	Has been hypothesized as dual of graviton under electric–magnetic duality in supergravity.
graviscalar	0	Also known as "radion". It appears in Kaluza–Klein theory.
hyperphoton	0	Hypothetical photon-like particle related to CP violations in kaon decay.
inflaton	0	Unidentified scalar force-carrier that is presumed to have physically caused cosmic inflation.
majoron	0	Predicted to understand neutrino masses by the seesaw mechanism.
sterile neutrino	1/2	Right-handed neutrinos are compatible with the Standard Model but have never been observed.
dual photon	1	Dual of the photon under electric–magnetic duality
magnetic photon	1	Hypothetical particle similar to the photon in the presence of magnetic monopoles.
pressuron	0	hypothetical scalar particle which couples to both gravity and matter theorized in 2013.
symmetron	0	Mediates the fifth force of the hypothetical symmetron field.
X and Y bosons	1	These leptoquarks are predicted by Grand Unified Theories to be heavier equivalents of the W and Z.
W′ and Z′ bosons	1	Predicted by several extension of the electroweak interaction.

=== Particles predicted by supersymmetric theories ===
Supersymmetry predicts the existence of superpartners to particles in the Standard Model, none of which have been confirmed experimentally. The sfermions (spin is 0) include:

Squarks
Name	Symbol	Superpartner of	Symbol
sup squark	$\tilde{u}$	up quark	$u$
sdown squark	$\tilde{d}$	down quark	$d$
scharm squark	$\tilde{c}$	charm quark	$c$
sstrange squark	$\tilde{s}$	strange quark	$s$
stop squark	$\tilde{t}$	top quark	$t$
sbottom squark	$\tilde{b}$	bottom quark	$b$

Sleptons
Name	Symbol	Superpartner of	Symbol
selectron	$\tilde{e}$	electron	$e$
selectron sneutrino	$\tilde{\nu}_e$	electron neutrino	$\nu_e$
smuon	$\tilde{\mu}$	muon	$\mu$
smuon sneutrino	$\tilde{\nu}_\mu$	muon neutrino	$\nu_\mu$
stau	$\tilde{\tau}$	tau	$\tau$
stau sneutrino	$\tilde{\nu}_\tau$	tau neutrino	$\nu_\tau$

Another hypothetical sfermion is the saxion, superpartner of the axion. It forms a supermultiplet, together with the axino and the axion, in supersymmetric extensions of Peccei–Quinn theory.

The predicted bosinos (spin 1/2) are

Bosinos (superpartners of bosons)
Name	superpartner of:	Notes
axino	axion	Forms a supermultiplet, together with the saxion and axion, in supersymmetric extensions of Peccei–Quinn theory.
dilatino	dilaton	Combines with the axion to form a complex scalar field
gluino	gluon	Majorana fermions that interact via the strong force as a color octet.
gravitino	graviton	Predicted by supergravity (SUGRA).
higgsino	Higgs boson	For supersymmetry there is a need for several Higgs bosons, neutral and charged, according with their superpartners.
photino	photon	Mixing with zino and neutral Higgsinos for neutralinos.
gaugino (wino, zino)	W and Z bosons	The charged wino mixing with the charged Higgsino for charginos, for the zino see line above.

Just as the photon, Z and W^{±} bosons are superpositions of the B^{0}, W^{0}, W^{1}, and W^{2} fields, the photino, zino, and wino^{±} are superpositions of the bino^{0}, wino^{0}, wino^{1}, and wino^{2}. No matter if one uses the original gauginos or this superpositions as a basis, the only predicted physical particles are neutralinos and charginos as a superposition of them together with the Higgsinos.

Other superpartner categories include:

- Charginos, superpositions of the superpartners of charged Standard Model bosons: charged Higgs boson and W boson. The Minimal Supersymmetric Standard Model (MSSM) predicts two pairs of charginos.
- Neutralinos, superpositions of the superpartners of neutral Standard Model bosons: neutral Higgs boson, Z boson and photon. The lightest neutralino is a leading candidate for dark matter. The MSSM predicts four neutralinos.
- Goldstinos are fermions produced by the spontaneous breaking of supersymmetry; they are the supersymmetric counterpart of Goldstone bosons.
- Sgoldstino, superpartners of goldstinos.

== Dark energy candidates ==
The following hypothetical particles have been proposed to explain dark energy:

Name	Description
Chameleon	Couples to matter more weakly than gravity, with non-linear variable effective mass. postulated as a dark energy candidate.
Acceleron	Particle that relates neutrino masses to dark energy.
Quintessence particle	Ultralight scalar boson whose vacuum expectation value evolves cosmologically; its coherent zero-momentum state produces negative pressure and late-time acceleration consistent with slowly rolling dark-energy models.
Phantom particle	Scalar boson with wrong-sign kinetic term yielding equation-of-state below −1; quantum excitations represent phantom dark energy causing super-accelerated expansion and possible future Big-Rip cosmology.
K-essence particle	Quantum of a scalar with noncanonical kinetic structure; attractor dynamics drive cosmic acceleration without fine-tuned potential, behaving as effective vacuum energy at late times.
Quintaxion	Axion-like pseudoscalar with extremely shallow periodic potential; misalignment energy evolves slowly and mimics quintessence, linking dark energy to Peccei–Quinn-type symmetries or string compactifications.
Ultralight axion	Axion-like particle with mass near Hubble scale (~10⁻³³ eV); field remains frozen cosmologically so particle condensate behaves as nearly constant vacuum energy today.
String axion	One of many ultralight pseudoscalars predicted by string compactifications; lightest modes can remain overdamped until recent epochs, providing axion-like particle interpretation of dark-energy density.
Proca dark-energy boson	Massive vector boson with self-interaction potential; homogeneous temporal component acquires vacuum energy density, and particle excitations correspond to vector-dark-energy quanta driving acceleration.
Dark-energy vector boson	General cosmic vector particle whose coherent background breaks Lorentz symmetry cosmologically; effective negative pressure arises from potential energy dominating kinetic contributions at late times.
Graviton condensate excitation	Collective bosonic mode of a macroscopic graviton condensate; emergent quasiparticles encode vacuum energy of spacetime and can phenomenologically mimic cosmological-constant–like dark-energy behavior.

== Dark matter candidates ==
The following categories are not unique or distinct: For example, either a WIMP or a WISP is also a FIP.

Meaning	Abbreviation	Explanation	Candidates
Feebly interacting particle	FIP	Particles that interacts very weakly with conventional matter	Massive gravitons
Gravitationally interacting massive particle	GIMP	Massive particles that only interact with matter gravitationally	
Lightest supersymmetric particle	LSP	Predictions by supersymmetry	Sneutrino, gravitino, neutralino
Strongly interacting massive particle	SIMP	Particle that interact strongly between themselves and weakly with ordinary matter	
Stable massive particles	SMP	Long-lived particle with appreciable mass	
Weakly interacting massive particle	WIMP	Heavy particles that only interact with matter weakly	neutralino, sterile neutrino
Weakly interacting slender particle	WISP	Light particles that only interact with matter weakly	axion

Hidden sector theories have also proposed forces that only interact with dark matter, like dark photons.

== From experimental anomalies ==
These hypothetical particles were claimed to be found or hypothesized to explain unusual experimental results. They relate to experimental anomalies but have not been reproduced independently or might be due to experimental errors (in chronological order):

Feynman diagram of a possible 750 GeV diphoton excess

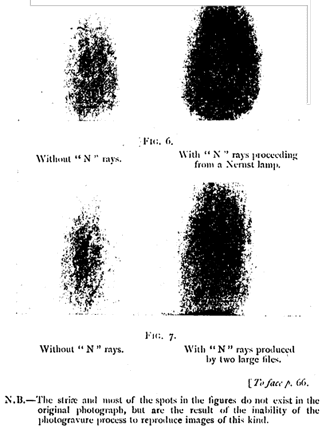
Fig. 6,7 from Prosper-René Blondlot: "Registration by Photography of the Action Produced by N Rays on a Small Electric Spark". Nancy, 1904.

Name	Date of anomaly	Originator of the anomaly	Details
N-ray	1903	Prosper-René Blondlot	An unknown form of radiation.
Oops-Leon	1976	Fermilab	Anomalous resonance at 6 GeV
Valentine's day monopole	1982	Blas Cabrera Navarro	Single magnetic monopole detected on February 14, 1982.
Meshugatron	1989	Fleischmann–Pons experiment	Predicted by Edward Teller in 1989 in an attempt to understand cold fusion claims
Oh-My-God particle	1991	High Resolution Fly's Eye Cosmic Ray Detector	320 EeV cosmic ray, most energetic ultra-high-energy cosmic ray detected as of 2026
Leptoquark (B-anomaly)	2012	Large Hadron Collider	Hypothetical boson coupling quarks to leptons proposed to explain persistent flavor-universality violations in B-meson decays, notably RK and RD ratios, indicating potential new semileptonic interactions beyond Standard Model predictions.
Z′(Lμ−Lτ)	2001	Brookhaven E821	Neutral gauge boson coupling to muon–tau lepton number difference proposed to explain muon anomalous magnetic-moment discrepancy and flavor anomalies while avoiding strong electron and quark coupling constraints.
750 GeV diphoton	2015	Large Hadron Collider	Resonance at 750 GeV signature of a bosonic particle
X17 particle	2015	ATOMKI	Hypothesized new vector boson to explain nuclear experiments with beryllium.
Amaterasu particle	2021	Telescope Array Project	240 EeV cosmic ray

== Others ==
- Cosmon, hypothetical state containing the observable universe before the Big Bang.
- Diproton (^{2}He), nuclei consisting of two protons and no neutrons. Observed, but without sufficient evidence.
- Diquark, hypothetical state of two quarks grouped inside a baryon.
- Fermi ball, hypothetical compound created in the early universe
- Geons, electromagnetic or gravitational waves which are held together in a confined region by the gravitational attraction of their own field of energy.
- Kaluza–Klein towers of particles, predicted by some models of extra dimensions. The extra-dimensional momentum is manifested as extra mass in four-dimensional spacetime.
- Pomerons, used to explain the elastic scattering of hadrons and the location of Regge poles in Regge theory. A counterpart to odderons.
- True muonium, atom composed of a muon and an anti-muon. Yet unobserved.
- Familons, hypothetical Goldstone bosons arising from the spontaneous breaking of a global family symmetry that distinguishes between generations of quarks and leptons.

=== By type ===
- Branons, scalar fields predicted in brane world models.
- Composite Higgs, models that consider the Higgs boson to be a composite particle.
  - Higgs doublets are hypothesized by some theories of physics beyond the Standard Model.
- Continuous spin particle are hypothetical massless particles related to the classification of the representations of the Poincaré group.
- Cryptons, any particle from the dark sector of string theory landscape.
- Elementary particles that are not bosons or fermions:
  - Paraparticles, exotic particles that can survive in a 3D-space and follow parastatistics
  - Plektons, particles that follow Braid statistics
- Exotic particles, particles with exotic properties like negative mass or complex mass.
- Exotic hadrons, particles composed of unusual combinations of quarks and gluons.
  - Exotic mesons
  - Exotic baryons
  - Glueball, hypothetical particle that consist of only gluons.
  - Quark bound states beyond the pentaquark, like hexaquarks and heptaquarks.
- Leptoquark, hypothetical particles that are neither bosons or fermions but carry lepton and baryon numbers.
- Magnetic monopole is a generic name for particles with non-zero magnetic charge. They are predicted by Grand Unification Theories. These may include:
  - Dirac monopoles, monopole that would allow charge quantization.
  - 't Hooft–Polyakov monopoles, Dirac monopole but without Dirac strings.
  - Wu–Yang monopoles, point-like monopole with potential of the form 1/r.
  - Dyons, extensions of the idea of a magnetic monopole.
- Majorana fermions, fermions that are their own anti-particle
- Mesonic molecule, two mesons bound together by strong force.
- Micro black hole, sub-atomic sized black holes.
  - Black hole electron, microscopic black hole with the properties of an electron.
  - Virtual black hole, microscopic black holes produced by fluctuations of space-time
- Minicharged particle are hypothetical subatomic particles charged with a tiny fraction of the electron charge.
- Mirror particles are predicted by theories that restore parity symmetry.
- Neutronium, hypothetical nuclei consisting only of neutrons (more than one). Examples include the tetraneutron.
- Primons, particles with statistics related to the distribution of prime numbers
- Preons were suggested as subparticles of quarks and leptons, but modern collider experiments have all but ruled out their existence.
  - Rishons, particles from the Rishon model of preons.
  - Chernons, hypothetical supersymmetric preons from little string theory.
- From superseded and obsolete theories
  - Caloric rays used until the 19th century to explain thermal radiation.
  - Light corpuscles, hypothetical classical particles used to explain optical phenomena.
  - Phlogiston, hypothetical combustible content in matter used to explain thermodynamics before the 18th century.
  - Ultramundane corpuscles, from Le Sage's theory of gravitation, used to explain gravitational phenomena.
- Strangelet, hypothetical particle that could form matter consisting of strange quarks.
- R-hadron, bound particle of a quark and a supersymmetric particle.
- T meson, hypothetical mesons composed of a top quark and one additional subatomic particle. Examples include the theta meson, formed by a top and an anti-top.
- Tachyons is a hypothetical particle that travels faster than the speed of light so they would paradoxically experience time in reverse (due to inversion of the theory of relativity) and would violate the known laws of causality. A tachyon has an imaginary rest mass.
- Unparticles, hypothetical particles that are massless and scale invariant.
  - Darkon, unparticle candidate of dark matter
- Weyl fermions, hypothetical spin-1/2 massless particles, only found as a quasiparticle.

== See also ==
- Alternatives to the Standard Higgs Model
- Chronon
- Chirality and helicity
- List of fictional elements, materials, isotopes and subatomic particles
- Timeline of particle discoveries
- List of particles
