= MilliQan Experiment =

Experiment at CERN's Large Hadron Collider

The MilliQan experiment is a small-scale detector experiment at CERN's Large Hadron Collider (LHC). MilliQan is not a separate CERN experiment but is handled as a CMS sub-detector, with a dedicated memorandum of understanding to define authorship and responsibilities. The goal of the MilliQan experiment is to detect millicharged particles: particles with charges much smaller than that of the electron. These particles are motivated by the existence of a dark photon, and discovery of millicharged particles would provide a first probe into the dark sector. The MilliQan prototype detector collected data during LHC Run 2 in 2018 and set competitive constraints on millicharged particle charges and masses. The Run 3 milliQan detectors are currently collecting data, following the completion of the prototype detector upgrade in 2023 and the installation of a second detector apparatus in 2024.

== Collaboration ==
The MilliQan collaboration has 29 members over 10 institutions in 5 countries. It was proposed in 2016 by Christopher Hill and Andy Haas. Its name is in reference to the Millikan Experiment, which measured the charge of the electron; milli-, the metric prefix for a thousandth; and Q, a common scientific unit for electric charge.

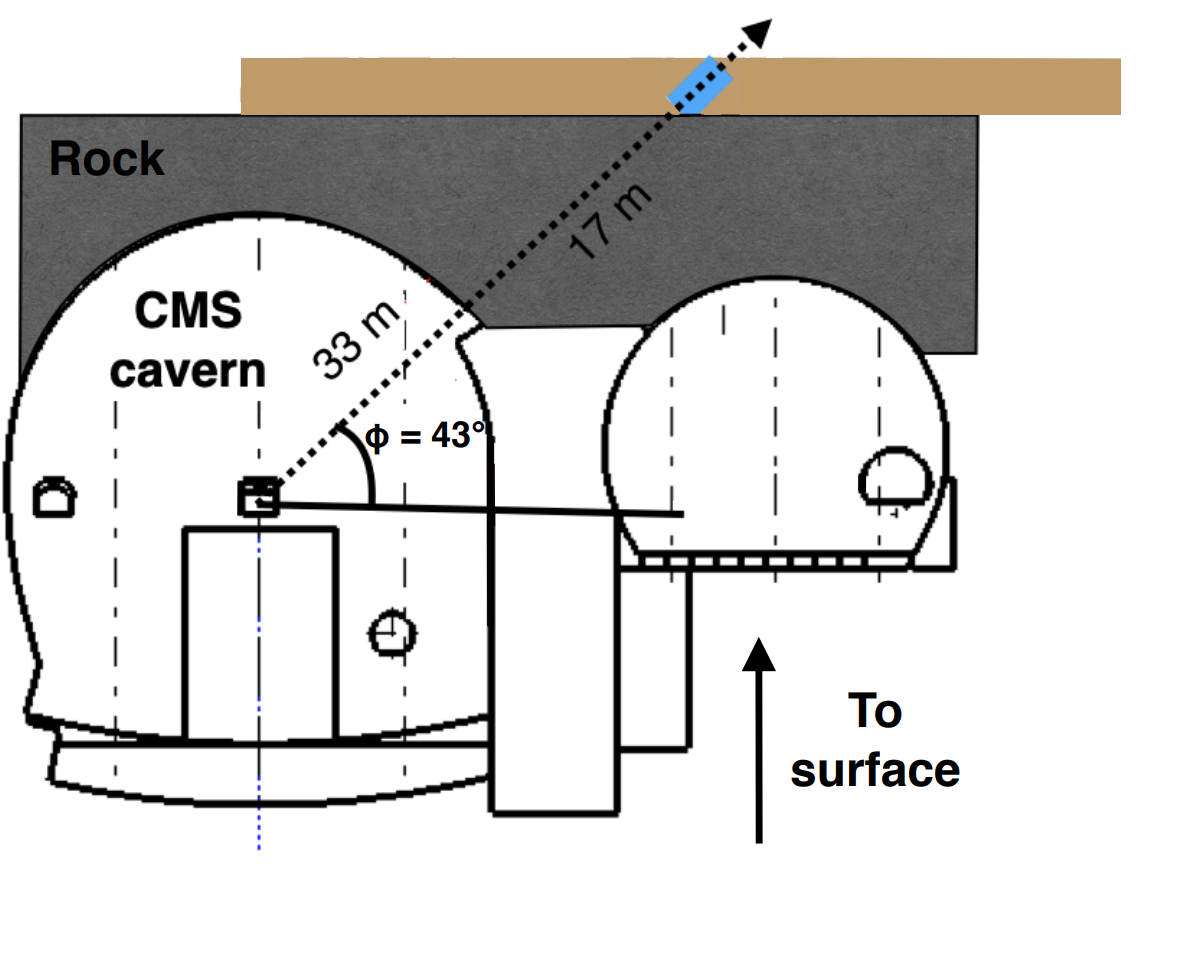
Position of the MilliQan detector (blue) with respect to CMS

== MilliQan detector ==
The MilliQan experiment is located in an underground access tunnel 33m from CMS. It is shielded from CMS by 17m of rock, protecting it from hadronic backgrounds while allowing millicharged particles to pass through to the detector. Located 70m underground, it is also shielded from cosmic ray backgrounds penetrating through the surface of the earth. The detector consists of a set of plastic scintillator bars and slabs which are mounted to photo-multiplier tubes (PMTs). The basic concept of the MilliQan detector is to exploit the relationship between ionization and charge in scintillator: ionization in scintillator due to a charged particle is proportional to the charge squared. This means that small charges will deposit amounts of energy that are small enough to evade the general purpose LHC detectors but large enough to be seen in a dedicated detector. Additionally, a charged particle will deposit a consistent amount of energy as it passes through a scintillator, so aligning a series of layers—consisting of scintillator coupled to PMTs—with the LHC P5 interaction point allows the experiment to be sensitive to millicharged particles.

=== MilliQan demonstrator ===
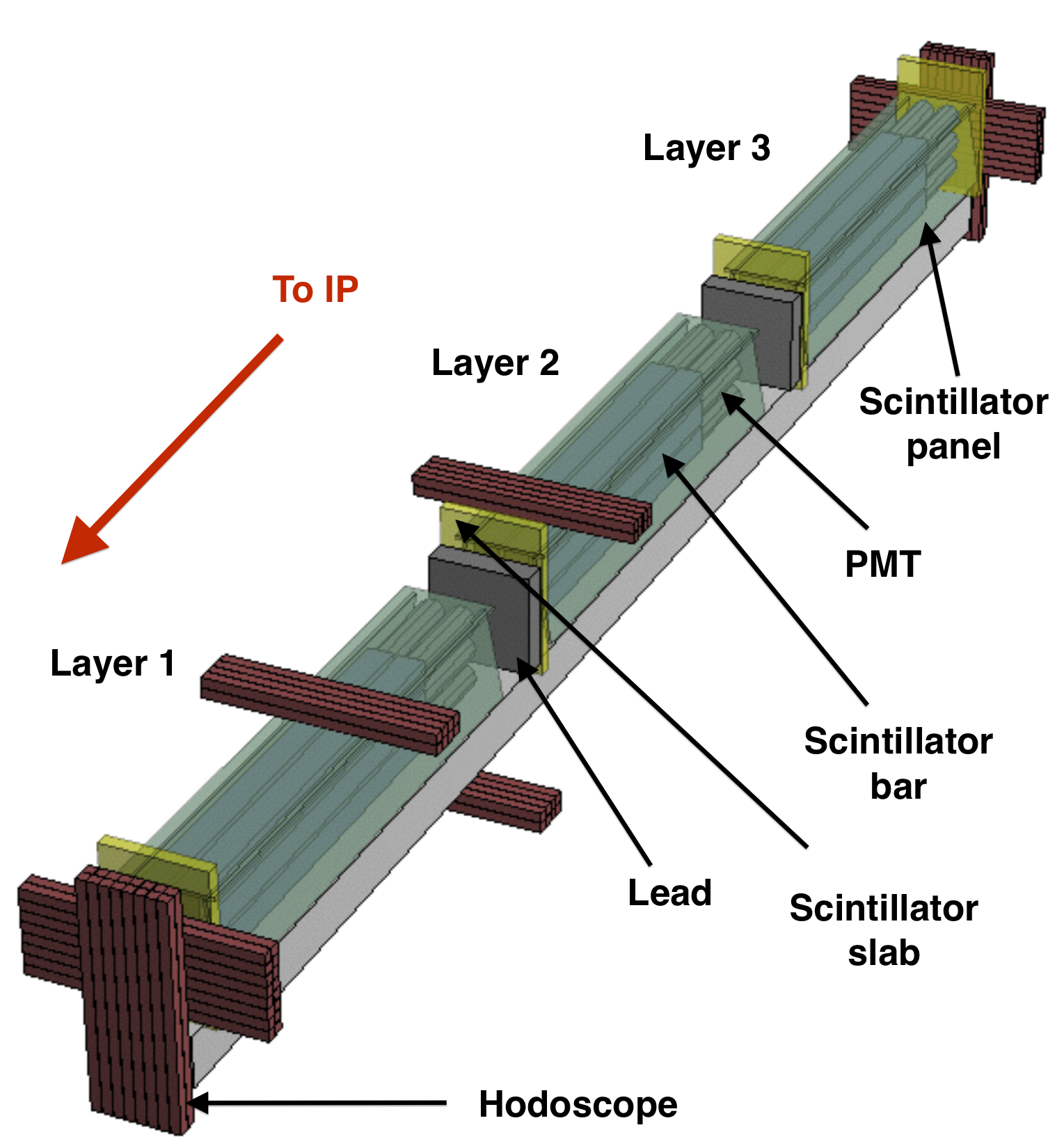
Diagram of the MilliQan Demonstrator

The first operation of the milliQan experiment came in the form of a ~1% prototype detector called the MilliQan demonstrator. It consisted of three layers of plastic scintillator bars mounted to PMTs in a 3x2 layout pointed towards the LHC interaction point near CMS, as well as additional material for shielding. The demonstrator collected 1106 hours of beam-on data and 1042 hours of beam-off data during LHC Run 2. This set leading constraints on the possible masses and charges for millicharged particles between masses from 20 to 4700 MeV and charges from 0.006e to 0.3e.

== Run 3 detectors ==
An upgrade to the milliQan detector for LHC Run 3 includes an expansion of the number of bars in the detector, from 3x2 to 4x4 bars per layer and from 3 to 4 layers. It also includes the addition of a new "slab detector", a detector which sacrifices charge sensitivity for acceptance in an effort to search for millicharged particles of higher mass. The bar detector upgrade was completed in June 2023, and the slab detector upgrade in July 2024. These upgrades are expected to improve sensitivity to millicharged particles with charges as low as 0.003e and masses up to 45 GeV.
