= Scalar–tensor theory =

Theory in physics with scalars and tensors both describing a force or interaction

In theoretical physics, a scalar–tensor theory is a field theory that includes both a scalar field and a tensor field to represent a certain interaction. For example, the Brans–Dicke theory of gravitation uses both a scalar field and a tensor field to mediate the gravitational interaction.

== Tensor fields and field theory ==
Modern physics tries to derive all physical theories from as few principles as possible. In this way, Newtonian mechanics as well as quantum mechanics are derived from William R. Hamilton's principle of least action. In this approach, the behavior of a system is not described via forces, but by functions which describe the energy of the system. Most important are the energetic quantities known as the Hamiltonian function and the Lagrangian function. Their derivatives in space are known as Hamiltonian density and the Lagrangian density. Going to these quantities leads to the field theories.

Modern physics uses field theories to explain reality. These fields can be scalar, vectorial or tensorial. An example of a scalar field is the temperature field. An example of a vector field is the wind velocity field. An example of a tensor field is the stress tensor field in a stressed body, used in continuum mechanics.

== Gravity as field theory ==
In physics, forces (as vectorial quantities) are given as the derivative (gradient) of scalar quantities named potentials. In classical physics before Albert Einstein, gravitation was given in the same way, as consequence of a gravitational force (vectorial), given through a scalar potential field, dependent of the mass of the particles. Thus, Newtonian gravity is called a scalar theory. The gravitational force is dependent of the distance r of the massive objects to each other (more exactly, their centre of mass). Mass is a parameter and space and time are unchangeable.

Einstein's general relativity (GR) is of another nature. It unifies space and time in a 4-dimensional manifold called space-time. In GR there is no gravitational force, instead, the actions we ascribed to being a force are the consequence of the local curvature of space-time. That curvature is defined mathematically by the so-called metric, which is a function of the total energy, including mass, in the area. The derivative of the metric is a function that approximates the classical Newtonian force in most cases. The metric is a tensorial quantity of degree 2 (it can be given as a 4x4 matrix, an object carrying 2 indices).

Another possibility to explain gravitation in this context is by using both tensor (of degree n>1) and scalar fields, i.e. so that gravitation is given neither solely through a scalar field nor solely through a metric. These are scalar–tensor theories of gravitation.

The field theoretical start of general relativity is given through the Lagrange density. It is a scalar and gauge invariant (look at gauge theories) quantity dependent on the scalar curvature R. This Lagrangian, following Hamilton's principle, leads to the field equations of David Hilbert and Einstein. If in the Lagrangian the curvature (or a quantity related to it) is multiplied with a square scalar field, field theories of scalar–tensor theories of gravitation are obtained. In them, the gravitational constant G of Isaac Newton is no longer a real constant but a quantity dependent of the scalar field.

=== Mathematical formulation ===
An action of such a gravitational scalar–tensor theory can be written as follows:

$$S = \frac{1}{c} \int {d^4 x \sqrt{-g} \frac{1}{2 \mu}} \times \left[ \Phi  R-\frac{\omega(\Phi)}{\Phi} (\partial_\sigma \Phi)^2-V(\Phi)+ 2 \mu~\mathcal{L}_m (g_{\mu \nu}, \Psi)  \right],$$

where $g$ is the metric determinant, $R$ is the Ricci scalar constructed from the metric $g_{\mu \nu}$, $\mu$ is a coupling constant with the dimensions $L^{-1} M^{-1}T^2$, $V(\Phi)$ is the scalar-field potential, $\mathcal{L}_m$ is the material Lagrangian and $\Psi$ represents the non-gravitational fields. Here, the Brans–Dicke parameter $\omega$ has been generalized to a function. Although $\mu$ is often written as being $8 \pi G / c^4$, one has to keep in mind that the fundamental constant $G$ there, is not the constant of gravitation that can be measured with, for instance, Cavendish type experiments. Indeed, the empirical gravitational constant is generally no longer a constant in scalar–tensor theories, but a function of the scalar field $\Phi$. The metric and scalar-field equations respectively write:

$$R_{\mu \nu}-\frac{1}{2}g_{\mu \nu}R= \frac{\mu}{\Phi}T_{\mu
\nu}+ \frac{1}{\Phi} [\nabla_\mu \nabla_\nu -g_{\mu \nu}\Box]\Phi
+\frac{\omega(\Phi)}{\Phi^2}(\partial_\mu \Phi \partial_\nu \Phi
- \frac{1}{2}g_{\mu \nu}\left|\partial_\alpha \Phi\right|^2)-g_{\mu \nu} \frac{V(\Phi)}{2 \Phi} ,$$

and

$$\frac{2\omega(\Phi)+3}{\Phi}\Box \Phi=  \frac{\mu}{\Phi} T   - \frac{\omega'(\Phi)}{\Phi} (\partial_\sigma \Phi)^2 + V'(\Phi) - 2 \frac{V(\Phi)}{\Phi} .$$

Also, the theory satisfies the following conservation equation, implying that test-particles follow space-time geodesics such as in general relativity:

$$\nabla_\sigma T^{\mu \sigma} = 0,$$

where $T^{\mu \sigma}$ is the stress-energy tensor defined as

$$T_{\mu \nu}=-\frac{2}{\sqrt{-g}} \frac{\delta(\sqrt{-g}\mathcal{L}_m)}{\delta g^{\mu \nu}}.$$

==== Newtonian approximation of the theory ====
Developing perturbatively the theory defined by the previous action around a Minkowskian background, and assuming non-relativistic gravitational sources, the first order gives the Newtonian approximation of the theory. In this approximation, and for a theory without potential, the metric writes

$$g_{00}=-1+ 2 \frac{U}{c^2}+\mathcal{O}(c^{-3}),~ g_{0i}=\mathcal{O}(c^{-2}),~ g_{ij}=\delta_{ij}+\mathcal{O}(c^{-1}),$$

with $U$ satisfying the following usual Poisson equation at the lowest order of the approximation:

$$\triangle U = 8 \pi G_\mathrm{eff}~ \rho+\mathcal{O}(c^{-1}),$$

where $\rho$ is the density of the gravitational source and $G_\mathrm{eff}= \frac{2 \omega_0 +4}{2 \omega_0 +3} \frac{G}{\Phi_0}$ (the subscript $_0$ indicates that the corresponding value is taken at present cosmological time and location). Therefore, the empirical gravitational constant is a function of the present value of the scalar-field background $\Phi_0$ and therefore theoretically depends on time and location. However, no deviation from the constancy of the Newtonian gravitational constant has been measured, implying that the scalar-field background $\Phi_0$ is pretty stable over time. Such a stability is not theoretically generally expected but can be theoretically explained by several mechanisms.

==== First post-Newtonian approximation of the theory ====
Developing the theory at the next level leads to the so-called first post-Newtonian order. For a theory without potential and in a system of coordinates respecting the weak isotropy condition (i.e., $g_{ij} \propto \delta_{ij} + \mathcal{O}(c^{-3})\,$), the metric takes the following form:

$$g_{00}=-1+\frac{2 W}{c^2} - \beta \frac{2 W^2}{c^4}+\mathcal{O}(c^{-5})$$

$$g_{0i}=-(\gamma+1) \frac{2W_i}{c^3}+\mathcal{O}(c^{-4})$$

$$g_{ij}=\delta_{ij} \left(1+\gamma \frac{2 W}{c^2} \right)+\mathcal{O}(c^{-3})$$

with

$$\Box W+\frac{1+2\beta -3\gamma }{c^2} W\triangle W + \frac{2}{c^2}(
1+\gamma) \partial_t J =-4\pi G_\mathrm{eff}\Sigma+ \mathcal{O}(c^{-3}) ~,$$

$$\triangle W_i-\partial x_i J =-4\pi G_\mathrm{eff}\Sigma^i + \mathcal{O}(c^{-1})~,$$

where $J$ is a function depending on the coordinate gauge

$$J =\partial_t W+\partial_k W_k+\mathcal{O}(c^{-1})~.$$

It corresponds to the remaining diffeomorphism degree of freedom that is not fixed by the weak isotropy condition. The sources are defined as

$$\Sigma =\frac{1}{c^2} (T^{00}+\gamma T^{kk})~, \qquad \Sigma^i =\frac{1}{c} T^{0i}~,$$

the so-called post-Newtonian parameters are

$$\gamma = \frac{\omega_0 +1}{\omega_0 +2}~,$$

$$\beta = 1+\frac{\omega_0^{\prime}}{( 2\omega_0 +3) (2\omega_0+4)^2}~,$$

and finally the empirical gravitational constant $G_\mathrm{eff}$ is given by

$$G_\mathrm{eff} = \frac{2\omega_0+4}{~2\omega_0+3~}\,G~,$$

where $G$ is the (true) constant that appears in the coupling constant $\mu$ defined previously.

== Observational constraints on the theory ==
Current observations indicate that $\gamma-1=(2.1 \pm 2.3)\times 10^{-5}$, which means that $\omega_0 > 40 000$. Although explaining such a value in the context of the original Brans–Dicke theory is impossible, Thibault Damour and Kenneth Nordtvedt found that the field equations of the general theory often lead to an evolution of the function $\omega$ toward infinity during the evolution of the universe. Hence, according to them, the current high value of the function $\omega$ could be a simple consequence of the evolution of the universe.

Seven years of data from the NASA MESSENGER mission constraints the post-Newtonian parameter $\beta$ for Mercury's perihelion shift to $|\beta-1|<1.6 \times 10^{-5}$.

Both constraints show that while the theory is still a potential candidate to replace general relativity, the scalar field must be very weakly coupled in order to explain current observations.

Generalized scalar-tensor theories have also been proposed as explanation for the accelerated expansion of the universe but the measurement of the speed of gravity with the gravitational wave event GW170817 has ruled this out.

== Higher-dimensional relativity and scalar–tensor theories ==
After the postulation of the general relativity by Einstein and Hilbert, Kaluza–Klein theory, a generalization in a 5-dimensional manifold based on the work of Theodor Kaluza and Oskar Klein, was developed in the 1920s. This theory possesses a 5-dimensional metric (with a compactified and constant 5th metric component, dependent on the gauge potential) and unifies gravitation and electromagnetism, i.e. there is a geometrization of electrodynamics.

This theory was modified in 1955 by Pascual Jordan in his projective relativity theory, in which, following group-theoretical reasonings, Jordan took a functional 5th metric component that led to a variable gravitational constant G. In his original work, he introduced coupling parameters of the scalar field, to change energy conservation as well, according to the ideas of Paul Dirac.

Following the conform equivalence theory, multidimensional theories of gravity are conform equivalent to theories of usual general relativity in 4 dimensions with an additional scalar field. One case of this is given by Jordan's theory, which, without breaking energy conservation (as it should be valid, following from microwave background radiation being of a black body), is equivalent to the theory of Carl H. Brans and Robert H. Dicke of 1961, so that it is usually spoken about the Brans–Dicke theory. The Brans–Dicke theory follows the idea of modifying Hilbert–Einstein theory to be compatible with Mach's principle. For this, Newton's gravitational constant had to be variable, dependent of the mass distribution in the universe, as a function of a scalar variable, coupled as a field in the Lagrangian. It uses a scalar field of infinite length scale (i.e. long-ranged), so, in the language of Hideki Yukawa's theory of nuclear physics, this scalar field is a massless field. This theory becomes Einsteinian for high values for the parameter of the scalar field.

In 1979, R. Wagoner proposed a generalization of scalar–tensor theories using more than one scalar field coupled to the scalar curvature.

Jordan–Brans–Dicke (JBD) theories although not changing the geodesic equation for test particles, change the motion of composite bodies to a more complex one. The coupling of a universal scalar field directly to the gravitational field gives rise to potentially observable effects for the motion of matter configurations to which gravitational energy contributes significantly. This is known as the Dicke–Nordtvedt effect, which leads to possible violations of the strong as well as the weak equivalence principle for extended masses.

JBD-type theories with short-ranged scalar fields use, according to Yukawa's theory, massive scalar fields. The first of this theories was proposed by Anthony Zee in 1979. He proposed a broken-symmetric theory of gravitation, combining the idea of Brans and Dicke with the one of spontaneous symmetry breaking, which is essential within the Standard Model (SM) of elementary particles, where the so-called spontaneous symmetry breaking leads to mass generation (as a consequence of particles interacting with the Higgs field). Zee proposed the Higgs field of SM as scalar field and so the Higgs field to generate the gravitational constant.

The interaction of the Higgs field with the particles that achieve mass through it is short-ranged (i.e. of Yukawa-type) and gravitational-like (one can get a Poisson equation from it), even within SM, so that Zee's idea was taken 1992 for a scalar–tensor theory with Higgs field as scalar field with Higgs mechanism. There, the massive scalar field couples to the masses, which are at the same time the source of the scalar Higgs field, which generates the mass of the elementary particles through symmetry breaking. For vanishing scalar field, this theories usually go through to standard general relativity and because of the nature of the massive field, it is possible for such theories that the parameter of the scalar field (the coupling constant) does not have to be as high as in standard JBD theories. Though, it is not clear yet which of these models explains better the phenomenology found in nature nor if such scalar fields are really given or necessary in nature. Nevertheless, JBD theories are used to explain inflation (for massless scalar fields then it is spoken of the inflaton field) after the Big Bang as well as the quintessence. Further, they are an option to explain dynamics usually given through the standard cold dark matter models, as well as MOND, axions (from symmetry breaking too), MACHOS,...

== Connection to string theory ==
A generic prediction of all string theory models is that the spin-2 graviton has a spin-0 partner called the dilaton. Hence, string theory predicts that the actual theory of gravity is a scalar–tensor theory rather than general relativity. However, the precise form of such a theory is not currently known because one does not have the mathematical tools in order to address the corresponding non-perturbative calculations. Besides, the precise effective 4-dimensional form of the theory is also confronted to the so-called landscape issue.

== See also ==
- Degenerate Higher-Order Scalar-Tensor theories – Theory of gravity
- Dilaton – Hypothetical particle
- Chameleon particle – Hypothetical scalar particle that couples to matter more weakly than gravity
- Pressuron – Hypothetical gravitational particle
- Horndeski's theory – Generalized theory of gravity
