= Symmetron =

The symmetron is a hypothesized elementary particle that mediates a fifth force in particle physics. It emerged as one potential solution to the symmetron field, a hypothesized scalar field.

== See also ==
- List of hypothetical particles
