= X17 particle =

Hypothetical subatomic particle

- Composition: Elementary particle
- Statistics: Bosonic
- Family: Boson
- Interactions: Proposed Fifth force
- Status: Hypothetical / Unconfirmed
- Symbol: X17
- Theorized: 2015
- Mass: 17.01±0.16 MeV/c^{2}
- Mean lifetime: 10^{−14} s
- Decays into: one electron and one positron
- Electric charge: 0 e
- Spin: 0 or 1 (debated)

The X17 particle (X17 boson) is a hypothetical subatomic particle proposed by Attila Krasznahorkay and his colleagues to explain certain anomalous measurement results; these anomalous measurements are known as ATOMKI anomaly or beryllium (^{8}Be) anomaly or X17 anomaly. The particle has been proposed to explain wide angles observed in the trajectory paths of particles produced during a nuclear transition of beryllium-8 nuclei and in helium nuclei. The X17 particle could be the force carrier for a postulated fifth force, possibly connected with dark matter, and has been described as a protophobic (i.e., ignoring protons) vector boson with a mass near 17 MeV/c^{2} — which is about 33 times heavier than an electron, but still very light for a boson. This is where it gets the name "X17".

The hypothesis originated from observations of unexpected wide-angle trajectories of electron-positron (e^{+}e^{−}) pairs produced during the nuclear transitions of excited Beryllium-8 nuclei. Similar resonant behavior was later reported by the same team in experiments involving Helium-4 and Carbon-12 nuclei. If confirmed, the X17 particle could represent the force carrier for a previously unknown fifth force of nature, often described in theoretical models as a "protophobic" (proton-ignoring) vector boson.

Because the X17 particle is not predicted by the Standard Model of particle physics, its existence would require significant extensions to current physical theories. It has garnered substantial interest as a potential "portal" to the dark sector, offering a possible candidate for dark matter interactions and a potential solution to other outstanding physics mysteries, such as the muon anomalous magnetic moment.

Multiple independent experiments worldwide—such as the NA64 experiment at CERN, the MEG II experiment at the Paul Scherrer Institute, and the PADME experiment at the Laboratori Nazionali di Frascati—have been searching for evidence of the X17 particle, with recent data placing increasingly stringent constraints on its allowed properties.

== History ==
In 2015, Krasznahorkay and his colleagues at ATOMKI, the Hungarian Institute for Nuclear Research, posited the existence of a new, light boson with a mass of about 17 MeV/c^{2} (about 33 times heavier than the electron). In an effort to find a dark photon, the team fired protons at thin targets of lithium-7, which created beryllium-8 nuclei in an excited state, which then decayed to the ground state and produced pairs of electrons and positrons. Excess decays were observed at an opening angle of 140° between the e^{+} and e^{−} particles and a combined energy of approximately 17 MeV/c^{2}. This indicated that a small fraction of the excited beryllium-8 might shed its excess energy in the form of a new particle. The result was successfully repeated by the team.

Feng et al. (2016) proposed that a "protophobic" X boson, with a mass of 16.7 MeV/c^{2}, suppressed couplings to protons relative to neutrons and electrons at femtometre range, could explain the data. The force may explain the g − 2 muon anomaly and provide a dark matter candidate. As of 2019, several research experiments are underway to attempt to validate or refute these results.

Krasznahorkay (2019) posted a preprint announcing that he and his team at ATOMKI had successfully observed the same anomalies in the decay of stable helium atoms as had been observed in beryllium-8, strengthening the case for the existence of the X17 particle.

This was covered in science journalism, focusing largely on the implications that the existence of the X17 particle and a corresponding fifth force would have in the search for dark matter.

In 2021 the workshop "Shedding light on X17" was held at Centro Enrico Fermi in Rome, Italy. The workshop discussed the ATOMKI anomaly and its theoretical interpretation and future experiments to confirm and explain it. One of the experiments that plans to repeat the original ATOMKI lithium–beryllium experiment is MEG II at PSI institute; the measurement was planned (in 2021) to be completed in 2022. Also Université de Montreal's 6 MV (6 megavolt) Tandem Van de Graaff Facility in Montreal has an experiment that attempts to reproduce the ATOMKI measurement; data taking should take place in early 2023.

In 2022, another preprint was published by Krasznahorkay et al. supporting the X17 particle hypothesis.

CERN's NA64 experiment and NA62 experiment have reported in 2021 and 2023 respectively results of conducted searches that have put stringent limits for the existence of the X17 particle.

In early 2023 the MEG II experiment performed its replication of the ATOMKI lithium–beryllium experiment; as of January 2024 the results have not yet been published (although the measurements were made in early 2023). As of September 2024, the analysis of measurement results has been done but an article has not been published.

In a presentation in a conference in June 2025, a member of the MEG II experiment collaborarion described the results of searches of the X17 particle as follows (verbatim quote):

"The [lithium-7 -> beryllium-8] process was successfully studied with MEG II using the CW [Cockroft-Walton accelerator]. No significant excess of events was observed, excluding the ATOMKI observation at 94% CL."

The results of MEG II searches are described in article:

In 2023, the ATOMKI group expanded their findings, reporting the observation of the X17 anomaly in the decay of the Giant Dipole Resonance of Beryllium-8, suggesting the particle can be created in both ground-state and excited-state transitions. Furthermore, in early 2024, an independent research group from the VNU University of Science in Vietnam claimed to have successfully replicated the original ATOMKI Beryllium-8 anomaly. Utilizing a different type of two-arm electron-positron pair spectrometer, the team reported confirming the presence of the anomaly, marking the first major independent observational support for the signal.

== Exploration ==
The X17 particle is theorized to be a new, light neutral boson with a mass of approximately 17 MeV/c^{2}. The exact spin and parity of the particle remain subjects of intense debate among theoretical physicists. Various phenomenological models have proposed the X17 as a vector, axial-vector, or pseudoscalar particle in order to remain consistent with both the observed kinematic anomalies and the stringent constraints imposed by historical accelerator data.

Recent theoretical work has also explored the possibility that the X17 particle possesses chiral couplings to quarks. This chiral framework naturally produces both vector and axial-vector couplings—similar to the Standard Model weak interactions—which may help reconcile the reported ATOMKI signals with other experimental limits.

=== Theoretical ===
Because a 17 MeV boson is not predicted by the Standard Model, its existence requires the introduction of new physical frameworks. The two primary categories of theories are "beyond the Standard Model" (BSM) extensions and novel interpretations of existing quantum phenomena.

==== Fifth force ====
The most prominent BSM interpretation posits that the X17 particle acts as a force-carrying gauge boson for a hypothetical fifth force of nature. Early models described this as a "protophobic" force, meaning the X17 particle would couple preferentially to neutrons and electrons while largely ignoring protons.

==== Dark sector ====
Furthermore, the X17 has been widely hypothesized to act as a "portal" mediator between ordinary matter and a hidden dark sector. In these frameworks, the X17 could play a crucial role in the thermal interactions and decays of dark matter candidates.

==== QED meson theory ====
An alternative theoretical approach argues that the X17 is not a fundamentally new elementary particle, but rather a collective excitation within the framework of quantum electrodynamics (QED). Proponents of this theory suggest that unknown dynamics in the QED sector could allow a light quark and antiquark to become bound and confined, forming a highly stable, neutral "QED meson." Under this interpretation, the anomalous 17 MeV signals correspond to the invariant mass of this composite state rather than a new fundamental force carrier.

== Skepticism ==
As of December 2019, the ATOMKI paper describing the particle has not been peer reviewed and should therefore be considered preliminary. In late 2019, a follow-up paper was published in Acta Physica Polonica B. Efforts by CERN and other groups to independently detect the particle have been unsuccessful so far.

The ATOMKI group had claimed to find various other new particles earlier in 2016 but abandoned these claims later, without an explanation of what caused the spurious signals. The group has also been accused of cherry-picking results that support new particles while discarding null results.

The X17 particle is not consistent with the Standard Model, so its existence would need to be explained by another theory.

Several dedicated experiments have recently tested the X17 hypothesis. In late 2024, the MEG II collaboration at the Paul Scherrer Institute published the results of a dedicated four-week data-taking run utilizing a magnetic spectrometer. Investigating the same ${}^{7}\text{Li}(p, e^+e^-){}^{8}\text{Be}$ reaction as ATOMKI, MEG II found no significant signal for the X17 particle, setting stringent new limits on its branching ratios. Conversely, the Positron Annihilation into Dark Matter Experiment (PADME) at the Frascati National Laboratory conducted a highly targeted resonance scan in 2025. By firing a positron beam at a fixed target and varying the center-of-mass energy between 16.4 and 17.4 MeV, they searched for the direct resonant production of the X17 ($e^+ e^- \to X17 \to e^+ e^-$). The collaboration utilized a "blind" analysis to prevent researcher bias. Upon unblinding, they reported a moderate event excess at roughly 16.90 MeV, which aligns closely with the expected mass of the X17, though it currently remains at a moderate statistical significance of about 2 standard deviations.

== Evolving theoretical models ==
Earlier models assumed X17 was a simple "dark photon" (a vector boson), but the theoretical framework to explain the X17 signal has evolved significantly as new constraints from particle physics experiments have emerged, therefore forcing theorists to develop more complex models.

=== Chiral and axial-vector couplings ===
Analyses of the Carbon-12 data have strongly disfavored a purely "vector" boson scenario. Instead, theorists propose that if X17 is a spin-1 particle, it likely possesses "chiral" or "axial-vector" couplings to quarks and leptons—similar to the Standard Model's weak force—to evade strict limits set by pion decay experiments.

=== The QED meson hypothesis ===
An alternative theoretical approach argues that X17 is not a new fundamental particle belonging to a "dark sector" at all. Physicist Cheuk-Yin Wong has proposed that the 17 MeV signal represents a previously unobserved "confined state" of Quantum Electrodynamics (QED)—essentially an isoscalar QED meson.

=== Links to other anomalies ===
Some theorists suggest that an X17 vector boson with specific chiral couplings could simultaneously explain the ATOMKI anomalies, the long-standing Muon $a = \frac{g - 2}{2}$ anomaly, and the muonic Lamb shift.

== See also ==
- Axion
- List of particles
- 750 GeV diphoton excess
