= Dual photon =

Hypothetical particle dual to the photon

Dual Photon
- Composition: Elementary particle
- Statistics: Bosonic
- Family: Gauge boson
- Interactions: Electromagnetic
- Status: Hypothetical
- Theorized: 2000s
- Electric charge: 0 e
- Spin: 1 ħ

In theoretical physics, the dual photon is a hypothetical elementary particle that is a dual of the photon under electric–magnetic duality which is predicted by some theoretical models, including M-theory.

It has been shown that including magnetic monopole in Maxwell's equations introduces a singularity. The only way to avoid the singularity is to include a second four-vector potential, called dual photon, in addition to the usual four-vector potential, photon. Additionally, it is found that the standard Lagrangian of electromagnetism is not symmetric under duality (i.e. symmetric under rotation between electric and magnetic charges), which causes problems for the stress–energy, spin, and orbital angular momentum tensors. To resolve this issue, a dual symmetric Lagrangian of electromagnetism has been proposed, which has a self-consistent separation of the spin and orbital degrees of freedom. The Poincaré symmetries imply that the dual electromagnetism naturally makes self-consistent conservation laws.

== Dual electromagnetism ==
The free electromagnetic field is described by a covariant antisymmetric tensor $F_{\alpha \beta}$ of rank 2 by

$$F_{\alpha \beta} = \partial_{\alpha} A_{\beta} - \partial_{\beta} A_{\alpha} \,.$$

where $A_{\alpha}$ is the electromagnetic potential.

The dual electromagnetic field $\star F_{\alpha \beta}$ is defined as

$$\star F_{\alpha \beta} = \frac{1}{2} \epsilon_{\alpha\beta}{}^{\sigma\lambda} F_{\sigma\lambda} .$$

where $\star$ is the Hodge star, and $\epsilon_{\mu\nu\sigma\lambda}$ is the Levi-Civita tensor.

For the electromagnetic field and its dual field, we have

$$\partial_{\alpha} F^{\alpha \beta} = 0,$$
$$\partial_{\alpha} {\star} F^{\alpha \beta} = 0.$$

Then, for a given gauge field $A_{\alpha}$, the dual configuration $\star A_{\alpha}$ is defined as

$$\star F^{\alpha \beta}(A) = F^{\alpha \beta} (\star A),$$
$$\star F^{\alpha \beta}(\star A) = -F^{\alpha \beta} (A).$$

where $\star A_{\alpha}$ the field potential of the dual photon, and non-locally linked to the original field potential $A_{\alpha}$.

== p-form electrodynamics ==
A p-form generalization of Maxwell's theory of electromagnetism is described by a gauge-invariant 2-form $\mathbf{F}$ defined as

$$\mathbf{F}=d\mathbf{A}$$.

which satisfies the equation of motion

$$d\,{\star}\mathbf{F} = \star\mathbf{J}$$

where $\star$ is the Hodge star.

This implies the following action in the spacetime manifold $M$:

$$S=\int_M \left[\frac{1}{2}\mathbf{F}\wedge \star\mathbf{F} - \mathbf{A} \wedge \star\mathbf{J}\right]$$

where $\star\mathbf{F}$ is the Hodge dual of the gauge-invariant 2-form $\mathbf{F}$ for the electromagnetic field.

== Dark photon ==
This artist's impression shows the dark photon A′ decays into an electron and a positron.

The dark photon is a spin-1 boson associated with a U(1) gauge field, which could be massless and behaves like electromagnetism. But, it could be unstable and massive, quickly decays into electron–positron pairs, and interact with electrons.

The dark photon was first suggested in 2008 by Lotty Ackerman, Matthew R. Buckley, Sean M. Carroll, and Marc Kamionkowski to explain the 'g–2 anomaly' in experiment E821 at Brookhaven National Laboratory. Nevertheless, it was ruled out in some experiments such as the PHENIX detector at the Relativistic Heavy Ion Collider at Brookhaven.

In 2015, the Hungarian Academy of Sciences's Institute for Nuclear Research in Debrecen, Hungary, suggested the existence of a new, light spin-1 boson, dubbed the X17 particle, 34 times heavier than the electron that decays into a pair of electron and positron with a combined energy of 17 MeV. In 2016, it was proposed that it is an X-boson with a mass of 16.7 MeV/c^{2}, which explains the g−2 muon anomaly.

== See also ==
- 't Hooft loop – Magnetic loop operator dual to the Wilson loop
- Covariant Maxwell's equations – Ways of writing certain laws of physics
- Dark radiation – Postulated type of radiation that mediates interactions of dark matter
- Dual graviton – Hypothetical particle found in supergravity
- Electromagnetic mathematics – Formulations of electromagnetism
- Kalb–Ramond field – Two-form field
- p-form electrodynamics – Generalization of electrodynamics
- Photino – Hypothetical superpartner of the photon
- Photon – Elementary particle or quantum of light
- Magnetic monopole – Hypothetical particle with one magnetic pole
- Magnetic photon – Hypothetical particle
- Maxwell's equations – Electromagnetism in general relativity
- List of hypothetical particles
