= Beam dump experiment =

Experiment with high-energy particles

A beam dump experiment is an experiment where a high-energy beam of particles (typically electrons, protons, sometimes muons) is directed into a dense target, called a "dump", in analogy to the beam dumps of particle accelerators. The dense target absorbs the primary beam and the conventional lepton by-products of the collisions, reducing the background of uninteresting particles. Particles that interact feebly with matter and have a long enough lifetime can exit the dump and be detected. Since many of the particles hypothesized in searches for new physics interact feebly (e.g. dark matter candidates), beam dump experiment are well suited for such searches. Since most Standard Model particles are absorbed in the dump, the technique is also suitable for studying weakly interacting particles like neutrinos.

== Characteristics ==
The beam is made of particles accelerated in a particle accelerator, such as protons at Fermilab or electrons at CERN, SLAC or Jefferson Lab. It impinges on a so-called "dump", a target made of thick, dense material, often metal such tungsten, lead, or copper, designed to stop the beam and absorb the particles that interact significantly, that is that interact via the electromagnetic or strong forces.

Particle that are not absorbed can be detected, often indirectly: if these particles are unstable and the product of their decay are ordinary particles, those interact significantly with matter and can be detected. The production point is well localized, and the dump acts as a filter against most ordinary particle backgrounds. Detectors are placed downstream of the dump, often shielded from the ordinary particles directly created by the primary beam, to detect weakly interacting particles (like neutrinos, axions or other hypothetical "hidden sector" particles) that pass through the dump unimpeded.

The advantages of beam dump experiments are that they are very sensitive to weakly interacting particles, can study long-lived particles with macroscopic lifetimes and have low background because most of the ordinary particles are absorbed in the dump. On the other hand, the experiments require high beam intensity in order to produce enough signal/stringent limits on new physics, need careful shielding and detector design and the result interpretation can be complicated because the signal depends on production and decay models.

== History ==
Beam dump experiments date back to the 1960s and 1970s, primarily at proton accelerators:

1960s: First beam dump experiments were conducted at CERN and BNL, mainly to study neutrinos produced in proton interactions with dense targets.

1970s: Beam dump experiments at SLAC and Fermilab began to systematically search for new weakly interacting particles, including light neutral bosons and heavy neutrinos.

1980s–1990s: Beam dump experiments played a role in rare particle searches and in measuring neutrino cross-sections.

2000s–present: Modern Beam dump experiments have been proposed and run to search for dark photons, axion-like particles (ALPs), light dark matter, and other hidden sector physics, for example experiment NA64 at CERN (electron beam dump), E137 at SLAC and BDX at Jefferson Lab.

== Research with beam dump experiments ==
Beam dump experiments are designed to study rare, weakly interacting particles.

- Neutrinos. When high-energy protons hit a dump, they produce pions and kaons, which then decay into neutrinos. Neutrinos go through the dump, and are detected downstream, which allows measurement of their properties.
- New light weakly interacting particles predicted in beyond the Standard Model hypotheses.
  - Dark photons: hypothetical vector bosons that couple weakly to the SM.
  - Axion-like particles (ALPs): light pseudoscalars predicted in some extensions of the Standard Model of particle physics.
  - Heavy neutral leptons (HNLs): sterile neutrino candidates.
- Rare decays of Standard Model particles. For example, beam dump experiments can detect decays of neutral mesons into exotic particles.

Early beam dump experiments in the 1960s at BNL and CERN helped confirm the existence of muon neutrinos. They also provided the first measurements of neutrino cross-sections at high energies. Nowadays, they set limits on new particles: Experiments like NA64 or BDX set constraints on dark photons, axions, and heavy neutral leptons. For example, E137 (SLAC, 1980s) constrained light axion-like particles decaying into photons over long distances. Current beam dump experiments are part of the intensity frontier, probing parameter spaces for dark matter and light hidden sector particles that are inaccessible to colliders. NA64 (CERN) has set stringent limits on dark photons in the sub-GeV range.

== See also ==
- Particle physics
- Standard Model
