= SIDM =

SIDM may refer to:

- Système intérimaire de drone MALE, now EADS Harfang
- self-interacting dark matter
- strongly interacting dark matter
- Serial impact dot matrix, a dot matrix printing technology
