= Hyperphoton =

Hypothetical particle

A hyperphoton is a hypothetical particle with a very low mass and spin equal to one. The hypothesis of the existence of hyperphotons is an explanation for the violation of CP-invariance in the two-pion decay of a long-lived neutral kaon $K_{L}^{0} \rightarrow \pi^{+} + \pi^{-}$. According to this hypothesis, there is a long-range very weak field generated by hypercharged particles (for example, baryons), whose quantum carrier is a hyperphoton, which acts differently on $K^{0}$ and $\hat{K^{0}}$ mesons whose hypercharges differ in signs.

== Criticism of the hypothesis ==
This hypothesis contradicts a number of experimental data and theoretical principles of physics. Thus, it follows that the probability of two-photon decay of a long-lived neutral kaon is proportional to the square of the kaon energy in the laboratory reference frame, which does not agree with experimental data on its independence from the kaon energy. The experimental data also contradict such a consequence of this hypothesis as a very high probability of hyperphoton emission during the decay of a long-lived neutral kaon and when a charged kaon decays into a one charged pion. This hypothesis implicitly uses the action at a distance rejected by modern physics. In addition, it implies a violation of the equivalence principle.

== See also ==
- Fifth force
- List of hypothetical particles
