= Pressuron =

Hypothetical gravitational particle

- Composition: Elementary particle
- Interactions: Gravity; Electroweak; Strong
- Status: Hypothetical
- Theorized: O. Minazzoli; A. Hees
- Mass: ?
- Electric charge: 0
- Spin: 0

The pressuron is a hypothetical scalar particle which couples to both gravity and matter theorised in 2013. Although originally postulated without self-interaction potential, the pressuron is also a dark energy candidate when it has such a potential. The pressuron takes its name from the fact that it decouples from matter in pressure-less regimes, allowing the scalar–tensor theory of gravity involving it to pass solar system tests, as well as tests on the equivalence principle, even though it is fundamentally coupled to matter. Such a decoupling mechanism could explain why gravitation seems to be well described by general relativity at present epoch, while it could actually be more complex than that. Because of the way it couples to matter, the pressuron is a special case of the hypothetical string dilaton. Therefore, it is one of the possible solutions to the present non-observation of various signals coming from massless or light scalar fields that are generically predicted in string theory.

== Mathematical formulation ==
The action of the scalar–tensor theory that involves the pressuron $\Phi$ can be written as
$$S= \frac{1}{c}\int  d^4x \sqrt{-g} \left[ \sqrt{\Phi} \mathcal{L}_m (g_{\mu \nu}, \Psi) +
\frac{1}{2\kappa}\left(\Phi  R-\frac{\omega(\Phi)}{\Phi} (\partial_\sigma \Phi)^2-V(\Phi) \right) \right],$$
where $R$ is the Ricci scalar constructed from the metric $g_{\mu \nu}$, $g$ is the metric determinant, $\kappa=\frac{8\pi G}{c^4}$, with $G$ the gravitational constant and $c$ the velocity of light in vacuum, $V(\Phi)$ is the pressuron potential and $\mathcal{L}_m$ is the matter Lagrangian and $\Psi$ represents the non-gravitational fields. The gravitational field equations therefore write
$$R_{\mu \nu}-\frac{1}{2}g_{\mu \nu}R= \kappa~ \frac{1}{\sqrt{\Phi}}T_{\mu \nu}+ \frac{1}{\Phi} [\nabla_{\mu} \nabla_{\nu} -g_{\mu \nu}\Box]\Phi
+\frac{\omega(\Phi)}{\Phi^2}\left[\partial_{\mu} \Phi \partial_{\nu} \Phi - \frac{1}{2}g_{\mu \nu}(\partial_{\alpha}\Phi)^2\right]-g_{\mu \nu} \frac{V(\Phi)}{2 \Phi} ,$$
and
$$\frac{2\omega(\Phi)+3}{\Phi}\Box \Phi= \kappa \frac{1}{\sqrt{\Phi}} \left(  T -  \mathcal{L}_m \right)  - \frac{\omega'(\Phi)}{\Phi} (\partial_\sigma \Phi)^2 + V'(\Phi) - 2 \frac{V(\Phi)}{\Phi}$$
where $T_{\mu\nu}$ is the stress–energy tensor of the matter field, and $T = g^{\mu\nu} T_{\mu\nu}$ is its trace.

=== Decoupling mechanism ===
If one considers a pressure-free perfect fluid (also known as a dust solution), the effective material Lagrangian becomes $\mathcal{L}_m = - c^2 \sum_i \mu_i \delta(x^\alpha_i)$, where $\mu_i$ is the mass of the ith particle, $x^\alpha_i$ its position, and $\delta(x^\alpha_i)$ the Dirac delta function, while at the same time the trace of the stress-energy tensor reduces to $T = - c^2 \sum_i \mu_i \delta(x^\alpha_i)$. Thus, there is an exact cancellation of the pressuron material source term $\left( T - \mathcal{L}_m \right)$, and hence the pressuron effectively decouples from pressure-free matter fields.

In other words, the specific coupling between the scalar field and the material fields in the Lagrangian leads to a decoupling between the scalar field and the matter fields in the limit that the matter field is exerting zero pressure.

=== Link to string theory ===
The pressuron shares some characteristics with the hypothetical string dilaton, and can actually be viewed as a special case of the wider family of possible dilatons. Since perturbative string theory cannot currently give the expected coupling of the string dilaton with material fields in the effective 4-dimension action, it seems conceivable that the pressuron may be the string dilaton in the 4-dimension effective action.

== Experimental search ==
=== Solar System ===
According to Minazzoli and Hees, post-Newtonian tests of gravitation in the Solar System should lead to the same results as what is expected from general relativity, except for gravitational redshift experiments, which should deviate from general relativity with a relative magnitude of the order of $\frac{1}{\omega_0} \frac{P}{c^2 \rho} \sim \frac{10^{-6}}{\omega_0}$, where $\omega_0$ is the current cosmological value of the scalar-field function $\omega(\Phi)$, and $P$ and $\rho$ are respectively the mean pressure and density of the Earth (for instance). Current best constraints on the gravitational redshift come from gravity probe A and are at the $10^{-4}$ level only. Therefore, the scalar–tensor theory that involves the pressuron is weakly constrained by Solar System experiments.

=== Cosmological variation of the fundamental coupling constants ===
Because of its non-minimal couplings, the pressuron leads to a variation of the fundamental coupling constants in regimes where it effectively couples to matter. However, since the pressuron decouples in both the matter-dominated era (which is essentially driven by pressure-less material fields) and the dark-energy-dominated era (which is essentially driven by dark energy), the pressuron is also weakly constrained by current cosmological tests on the variation of the coupling constants.

=== Test with binary pulsars ===
Although no calculations seem to have been performed regarding this issue, it has been argued that binary pulsars should give greater constraints on the existence of the pressuron because of the high pressure of bodies involved in such systems.

== See also ==
- List of hypothetical particles
