= Graviscalar =

Hypothetical particle

In theoretical physics, the hypothetical particle called the graviscalar or radion emerges as an excitation of general relativity's metric tensor, i.e. gravitational field, but is indistinguishable from a scalar in four dimensions, as shown in Kaluza–Klein theory. The scalar field $\phi$ comes from a component of the metric tensor $g_{55}$ where the figure 5 labels an additional fifth dimension. The only variations in the scalar field represent variations in the size of the extra dimension. Also, in models with multiple extra dimensions, there exist several such particles. Moreover, in theories with extended supersymmetry, a graviscalar is usually a superpartner of the graviton that behaves as a particle with spin 0. This concept closely relates to the gauged Higgs models.

== See also ==
- Graviphoton (aka gravivector)
- Dilaton
- Kaluza–Klein theory
- Randall–Sundrum models
- Goldberger–Wise mechanism
- List of hypothetical particles
