= Hypervapotron =

A cooling system used in broadcasting and nuclear reactors

The hypervapotron is a high heat flux cooling system for vacuum tubes that is used in broadcasting and in certain nuclear reactors.

A hypervapotron is a water-cooled device which combines internal finned surfaces with boiling heat transfer to maximise its heat transfer rates, achieving sustained heat fluxes in the region of 20 – 30MW/m^{2}.

== History ==
The basic technology, known as the vapotron, was developed in 1950 by Charles Beurtheret (1909–1977) at the Compagnie Française Thomson-Houston in Saint-Germain-en-Laye. The principle involves immersing the glass electron tube in a metal tank filled with water. When the tube is operating, the water is pumped around a closed loop. Cold liquid water enters the bottom of the tank and vaporizes upon contact with the heat emitted by the tube's dissipation fins. The hot vapor rises to a condenser, which cools it. The heat transfer fluid is then reinjected into the tank.

The supervapotron was invented in 1959, which takes advantage of both nucleate and partial-boiling to achieve high efficiency which is achieved through hydrodynamic mutual interference of adjacent protrusions.

The hypervapotron was invented by changing the direction of water flow along the slots, allowing jets of steam to mix with the cool water and cool more rapidly, reducing the need to vent steam. The heat removal capabilities of early hypervapotrons have been improved by new designs, including features such as millimeter-scale fin modifications and microscale surface enhancements.

== Use in broadcasting ==
The longwave transmitter of Radio Monte-Carlo, located on the Fontbonne plateau, was equipped with vapotron tubes in 1955.

== Use in nuclear reactors ==
Hypervapotrons are used by fusion research centres for magnetically confined fusion reactors. They have been used as beam dumps, including for the divertor in the Joint European Tokamak (JET), as well as using jackets with hypervapotron fins to cool the vacuum tubes of the ion cyclotron radio frequency source used in fusion reactors.
