= Dark radiation =

Postulated type of radiation that mediates interactions of dark matter

Dark radiation (also dark electromagnetism) is a postulated type of radiation that mediates interactions of dark matter.

By analogy to the way photons mediate electromagnetic interactions between particles in the Standard Model (called baryonic matter in cosmology), dark radiation is proposed to mediate interactions between dark matter particles. Similar to dark matter particles, the hypothetical dark radiation does not interact with Standard Model particles.

There has been no notable evidence for the existence of such radiation; baryonic matter contains multiple interacting particle types, but it is not known if dark matter does. Cosmic microwave background data may indicate that the number of effective neutrino degrees of freedom is more than 3.046, which is slightly more than the standard case for 3 types of neutrino. This extra degree of freedom could arise from having a non-trivial amount of dark radiation in the universe. One possible candidate for dark radiation is the sterile neutrino.

== See also ==
- Dark photon – Hypothetical force carrier particle connected to dark matter
- Fifth force – Speculative physics theory
- Dual photon – Hypothetical particle dual to the photon
- Photino – Hypothetical superpartner of the photon
- Dark sector – Hypothetical collections of yet-unobserved quantum fields and particles
