= NA64 experiment =

International scientific experiment at CERN

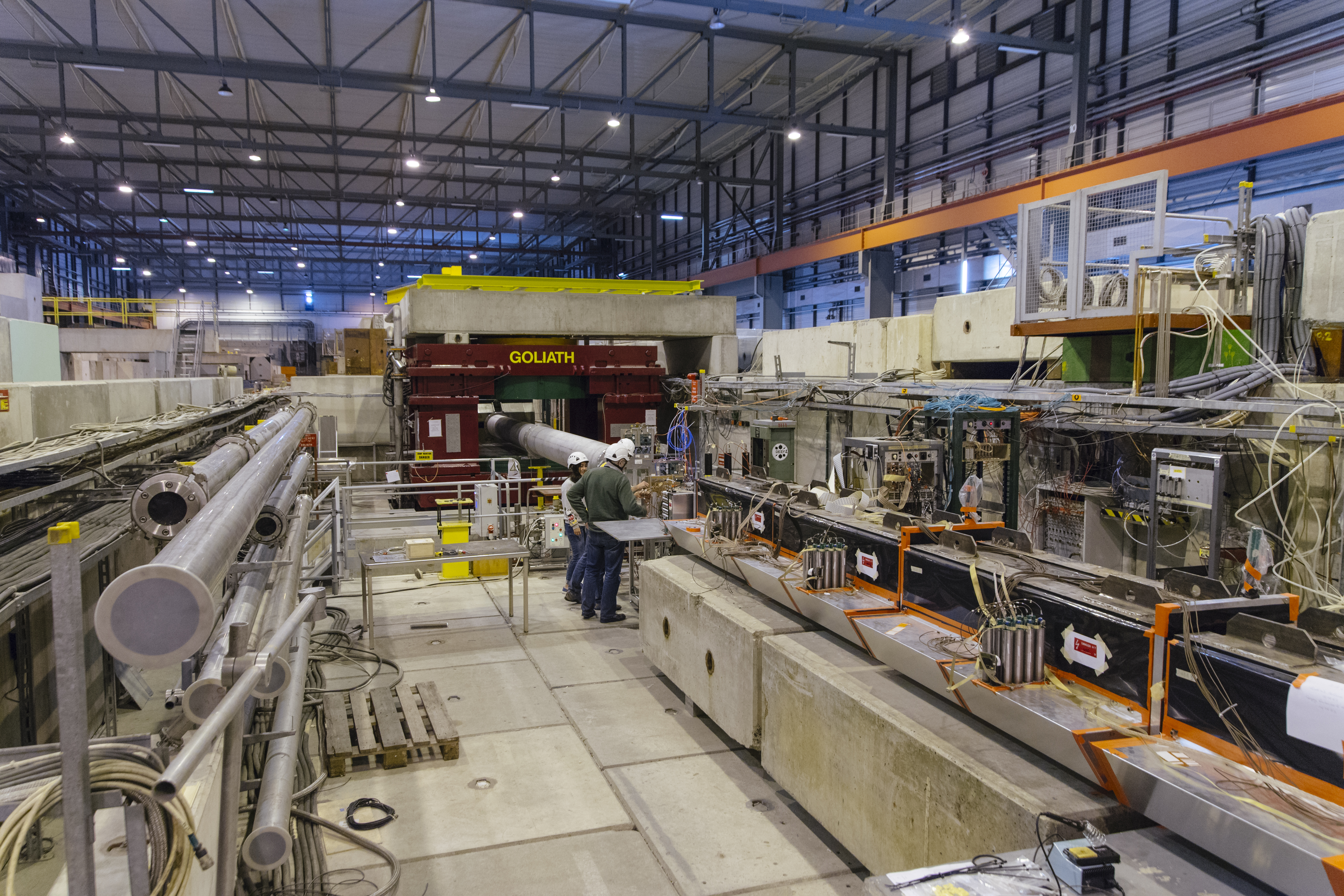
NA64 experiment ECAL and HCAL

NA64 experiment is one of the several experiments at CERN's Super Proton Synchrotron (SPS) particle collider searching for dark sector particles. It is a fixed target experiment, specifically a beam dump experiment, in which an electron beam of energy between 100–150 GeV, strikes fixed atomic nuclei. The primary goal of NA64 is to find unknown and hypothetical particles such as dark photons, axions, and axion-like particles.

Secondarily this experiment will also use the muon beams from the SPS with the goal of finding particles that mainly interact with muons and hence could give valuable insights into muon's anomalous magnetic moment. Few other goals of NA64 include searching for invisible neutral kaon decays and meson decays, as well as the hunt of particles that could consist the mirror-type dark matter.
