= Fifth force =

Speculative physics theory

In physics, a fifth force is a hypothetical fundamental interaction (also known as fundamental force) beyond the four known interactions in nature: gravitational, electromagnetic, strong nuclear, and weak nuclear forces. Some speculative theories have proposed a fifth force to explain various anomalous observations that do not fit existing theories. The specific characteristics of a putative fifth force depend on which hypothesis is being advanced. No evidence to support these models has been found.

The fifth force is also used when referring to a specific theory advanced by Ephraim Fischbach in 1986 to explain experimental deviations in the theory of gravity. Later analysis failed to reproduce those deviations.

== History ==
The term fifth force originates in a 1986 paper by Ephraim Fischbach et al. who reanalyzed the data from the Eötvös experiment of Loránd Eötvös from earlier in the century; the reanalysis found a distance dependence to gravity that deviates from the inverse square law. The reanalysis which was sparked by theoretical work in 1971 by Yasunori Fujii proposes a model that changes distance dependence with a Yukawa potential-like term:
$$V(r) = -G_\infty \frac{m_im_j}{r_{ij}}(1+\alpha e^{-r/\lambda})$$
The parameter $\alpha$ characterizes the strength and $\lambda$ the range of the interaction. Fischbach's paper found a strength around 1% of gravity and a range of a few hundred meters. The effect of this potential can be described equivalently as exchange of vector and/or scalar bosons, that is a predicting as yet undetected new particles. However, many subsequent attempts to reproduce the deviations have failed.

== Theory ==
Theoretical proposals for a fifth force are driven by inconsistencies between the existing models of general relativity and quantum field theory, and also between the hierarchy problem and the cosmological constant problem. Both issues suggest the possibility of corrections to the gravitational potential around 100 μm.

The accelerating expansion of the universe has been attributed to a form of energy called dark energy. Some physicists speculate that a form of dark energy called quintessence could be a fifth force.

Other theories that suggest a fifth-force assume spin-dependent exotic interactions, in which the putative force depends on the spin orientation of particles such as electrons, protons, or neutrons.

== Experimental approaches ==
There are at least three kinds of searches that can be undertaken, which depend on the kind of force being considered, and its range.

=== Equivalence principle ===
One way to search for a fifth force is with tests of the strong equivalence principle, one of the most powerful tests of general relativity, also known as Einstein's theory of gravity. Alternative theories of gravity, such as Brans–Dicke theory, postulate a fifth force — possibly one with infinite range. This is because gravitational interactions, in theories other than general relativity, have degrees of freedom other than the "metric", which dictates the curvature of space, and different kinds of degrees of freedom produce different effects. For example, a scalar field cannot produce the bending of light rays.

The fifth force would manifest itself in an effect on solar system orbits, called the Nordtvedt effect. This is tested with Lunar Laser Ranging experiment and very-long-baseline interferometry.

=== Extra dimensions ===
Another kind of fifth force, which arises in Kaluza–Klein theory, where the universe has extra dimensions, or in supergravity or string theory is the Yukawa force, which is transmitted by a light scalar field (i.e. a scalar field with a long Compton wavelength, which determines the range). This concept is part of the motivation for an experimental effort to test gravity on very small scales that requires extremely sensitive experiments which search for a deviation from the inverse-square law of gravity over short distances. They are looking for signs of a Yukawa-like term in the interaction potential.

Australian researchers, attempting to measure the gravitational constant deep in a mine shaft, found a discrepancy between the predicted and measured value, with the measured value being two percent too small. They concluded that the results may be explained by a repulsive fifth force with a range from a few centimetres to a kilometre. Similar experiments have been carried out on board a submarine, USS Dolphin (AGSS-555), while deeply submerged. A further experiment measuring the gravitational constant in a deep borehole in the Greenland ice sheet found discrepancies of a few percent, but it was not possible to eliminate a geological source for the observed signal.

=== Cepheid variables ===
Jain et al. (2012) examined existing data on the rate of pulsation of over a thousand cepheid variable stars in 25 galaxies. Theory suggests that the rate of cepheid pulsation in galaxies screened from a hypothetical fifth force by neighbouring clusters, would follow a different pattern from cepheids that are not screened. They were unable to find any variation from Einstein's theory of gravity.

=== Other approaches ===
Some experiments used a lake plus a tower that is 320 meters high. A comprehensive review by Ephraim Fischbach and Carrick Talmadge suggested there is no compelling evidence for the fifth force, though scientists still search for it. The Fischbach–Talmadge article was written in 1992, and since then, other evidence has come to light that may indicate a fifth force.

The above experiments search for a fifth force that is, like gravity, independent of the composition of an object, so all objects experience the force in proportion to their masses. Forces that depend on the composition of an object can be very sensitively tested by torsion balance experiments of a type invented by Loránd Eötvös. Such forces may depend, for example, on the ratio of protons to neutrons in an atomic nucleus, nuclear spin, or the relative amount of different kinds of binding energy in a nucleus (see the semi-empirical mass formula). Searches have been done from very short ranges, to municipal scales, to the scale of the Earth, the Sun, and dark matter at the center of the galaxy.

=== Claims of new particles ===
In 2015, Attila Krasznahorkay at ATOMKI, the Hungarian Academy of Sciences's Institute for Nuclear Research in Debrecen, Hungary, and his colleagues posited the existence of a new, light boson only 34 times heavier than the electron (17 MeV). In an effort to find a dark photon, the Hungarian team fired protons at thin targets of lithium-7, which created unstable beryllium-8 nuclei that then decayed and ejected pairs of electrons and positrons. Excess decays were observed at an opening angle of 140° between the e^{+} and e^{−}, and a combined energy of 17 MeV, which indicated that a small fraction of beryllium-8 will shed excess energy in the form of a new particle.

Feng et al. (2016) proposed a theory for the protophobic (i.e. "proton-ignoring") X-boson with a mass of 16.7 MeV with suppressed couplings to protons relative to neutrons and electrons and femtometer range could explain the data. The force may explain the muon g − 2 anomaly and provide a dark matter candidate. In 2022 another experimental measurement from the same Hungarian team but based on C-12 Be-11 collisions provided additional evidence for this boson, now called X-17. The scientific community has expressed skepticism of the experimental results as the team involved has little interaction with the particle physics community and has a history of reports that cannot be replicated.

== See also ==
- Affine gauge theory – Gauge theory with affine connections
- Complex system – System composed of many interacting components
- Graviphoton – Hypothetical particle in gravity theories
- Modified Newtonian dynamics – Hypothesis proposing a modification of Newton's laws
- Physics beyond the Standard Model – Theories trying to extend known physics
- Self-organization – Process of forming order by local interactions
- Fifth element
