= Chris Hill (physicist) =

American physicist

Christopher S. Hill
- Born: Bayport, New York, U.S.
- Education: Dartmouth College (A.B.); University of California, Davis (M.S., Ph.D.)
- Known for: Co-founding the milliQan Experiment
- Awards: Fellow of the American Physical Society
- Scientific career
- Fields: Particle physics
- Workplaces: The Ohio State University; CERN
- Doctoral advisor: Richard Lander

Christopher Scott Hill is an American particle physicist and Professor of Physics at The Ohio State University. He is known for his contributions to the study of the top quark and for co-founding the milliQan Experiment at the Large Hadron Collider.

== Early life and education ==
Hill was born in Bayport, New York. He graduated from Bayport-Blue Point High School in 1990. He earned his A.B. in physics and philosophy from Dartmouth College in 1994. He then attended the University of California, Davis, where he received his M.S. and Ph.D. in physics in 1998 and 2001, respectively, under the supervision of Richard Lander.

== Career ==
From 1998 to 2001, Hill conducted doctoral research on the CDF experiment at Fermilab, studying top quark properties in proton-antiproton collisions. He continued this research as a postdoctoral fellow at the University of California, Santa Barbara from 2001 to 2006, where he was responsible for commissioning and operating the CDF silicon tracking detector—the largest of its kind at the time. During this period, Hill and his supervisor Joe Incandela developed the "decay-length method" for measuring the top quark mass, utilizing the Lorentz boost of bottom quarks in top decay.

In 2006, Hill became a lecturer in physics at the University of Bristol, shifting his research to physics beyond the Standard Model with the CMS experiment at the LHC at CERN. He was an early proponent of searching for "long-lived particles" (LLPs) at the LHC, which has since become a significant area of research in high-energy physics.

In 2010, Hill joined The Ohio State University as an associate professor, becoming a full professor in 2014. From 2012 to 2014, he served as deputy physics coordinator of the CMS experiment during the discovery of the Higgs boson.

In 2014, Hill co-founded the milliQan Experiment to search for millicharged particles, potential candidates for dark matter. He has served as co-spokesperson of the milliQan collaboration since its inception.

== Awards and honors ==
- Fermilab LPC Distinguished Researcher (2016)
- Elected Fellow of the American Physical Society (2016) "For contributions to silicon tracking detectors at hadron colliders and for the development of novel analysis techniques, particularly those used in the searches for beyond the standard model particles with long lifetimes."
