= Ephraim Fischbach =

American physicist and professor (born 1942)

- Born: 1942 (age 83–84); Brooklyn, New York
- Education: Columbia University; University of Pennsylvania
- Known for: Fifth force; Solar flare
- Awards: Fellow of the American Physical Society
- Scientific career
- Academic advisors: Henry Primakoff
- Doctoral students: Harry Kloor

Ephraim Fischbach (born 1942) is an American physicist and a professor at Purdue University. He is best known for his attempts to find a fifth force of nature and his research relating to the detection of neutrinos. He has also done work relating to the prediction of solar flares and the detection of radiation by cell phones.

Fischbach studies variation in radioactive decay rates, suggesting that neutrino emission from the Sun reduces the rate of nuclear decay. He reanalysed the Eötvös experiment, which he saw as evidence for a fifth physical force. However, in 1992, he and Carrick Talmadge conducted an experiment which found no compelling evidence for a fifth force.

Fischbach has been a fellow of the American Physical Society since 2001, and a professor at Purdue since 1979. He also was an associate professor at the Institute for Theoretical Physics in Stony Brook, New York from 1978 to 1979. He received a B.A. in physics in 1963 from Columbia University and a Ph.D. in 1967 from the University of Pennsylvania.
