= Graviphoton =

Hypothetical particle in gravity theories

In theoretical physics and quantum physics, a graviphoton or gravivector is a hypothetical particle which emerges as an excitation of the metric tensor (i.e. gravitational field) in spacetime dimensions higher than four, as described in Kaluza–Klein theory.

However, its crucial physical properties are analogous to a (massive) photon: it induces a "vector force", sometimes dubbed a "fifth force". The electromagnetic potential $A_\mu$ emerges from an extra component of the metric tensor $g_{\mu 5}$, where the figure 5 labels an additional, fifth dimension.

In gravity theories with extended supersymmetry (extended supergravities), a graviphoton is normally a superpartner of the graviton that behaves like a photon, and is prone to couple with gravitational strength, as was appreciated in the late 1970s. Unlike the graviton, it may provide a repulsive (as well as an attractive) force, and thus, in some technical sense, a type of anti-gravity. Under special circumstances, in several natural models, often descending from five-dimensional theories mentioned, it may actually cancel the gravitational attraction in the static limit. Joël Scherk investigated semirealistic aspects of this phenomenon, stimulating searches for physical manifestations of this mechanism.

== See also ==
- Graviscalar (a.k.a. radion)
- Supergravity
- List of hypothetical particles
