= Saxion =

Hypothetical elementary particle

The saxion is the scalar superpartner of the axion, and part of a chiral superfield. The axion represents the CP violating theory of the Standard Model. The axion and saxion are examples of the scalar boson class of particles with a very small mass, and a charge of 0.

== See also ==
- List of hypothetical particles
