= Heptaquark =

Exotic hadron containing seven quarks or antiquarks

In particle physics, heptaquarks are a family of hypothetical composite particles, each consisting of five quarks and two antiquarks of any flavours.

== Properties ==
One model predicts that the lowest-energy heptaquark state should be a spin-1/2 or spin-3/2 state of energy 2.5 GeV. Another study found that the most stable heptaquark should include three strange quarks and two strange antiquarks.

== See also ==
- Exotic baryon
