= Exotic baryon =

Subatomic particle with atypical quark content

In particle physics, exotic baryons are a type of hadron (bound states of quarks and gluons) with half-integer spin, but with a quark content different from the three quarks (qqq) present in conventional baryons. An example would be pentaquarks, consisting of four quarks and one antiquark (qqqqq̅).

So far, the only observed exotic baryons are the pentaquarks P_{c}(4380)^{+}, P_{c}(4450)^{+} discovered in 2015, P_{c}(4312)^{+} in 2019 and P^{Λ}_{ψs}(4338)^{0} in 2022 by the LHCb collaboration.

Several types of exotic baryons that require physics beyond the Standard Model have been conjectured in order to explain specific experimental anomalies. There is no independent experimental evidence for any of these particles. One example is supersymmetric R-baryons, which are bound states of 3 quarks and a gluino. The lightest R-baryon is denoted as S^{0} and consists of an up quark, a down quark, a strange quark and a gluino. This particle is expected to be long lived or stable and has been invoked to explain ultra-high-energy cosmic rays. Stable exotic baryons are also candidates for strongly interacting dark matter.

It has been speculated by futurologist Ray Kurzweil that by the end of the 21st century it might be possible by using femtotechnology to create new chemical elements composed of exotic baryons that would eventually constitute a new periodic table of elements in which the elements would have completely different properties than the regular chemical elements.
