= Sgoldstino =

Superpartners in relativistic quantum field theories

A sgoldstino is any of the spin-0 superpartners of the goldstino in relativistic quantum field theories with spontaneously broken supersymmetry. The term sgoldstino was first used in 1998.

In 2016, Petersson and Torre hypothesized that a sgoldstino particle might be responsible for the observed 750 GeV diphoton excess observed by Large Hadron Collider experiments.
