= Beam dump =

Method of dissipating energy of particles

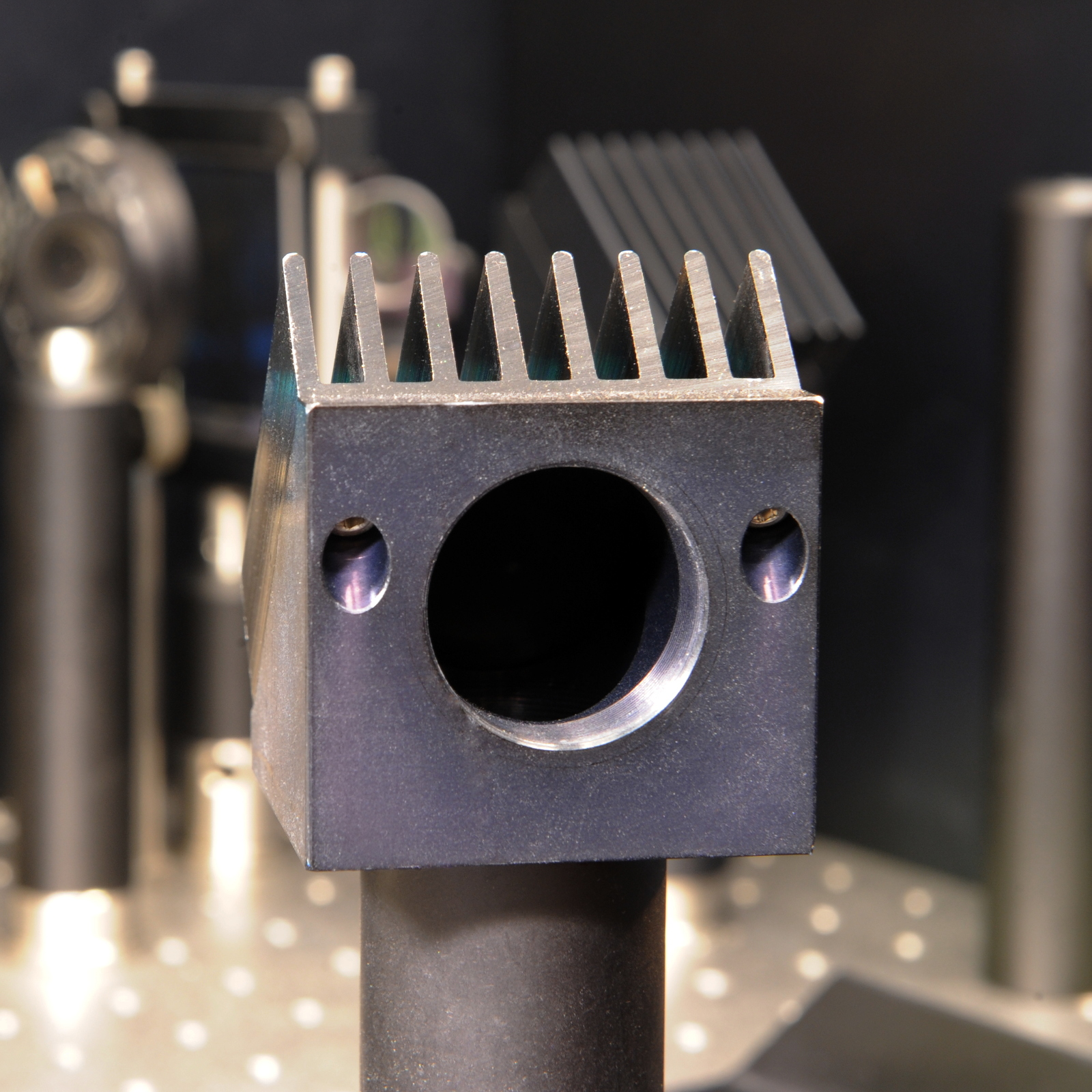
Optical beam dump suited for several watts of laser light

A beam dump, also known as a beam block, a beam stop, or a beam trap, is a device designed to absorb the energy of photons or other particles within an energetic beam.

== Types of beam dumps ==
=== Beam blocks ===
Beam blocks are simple optical elements that absorb a beam of light using a material with strong absorption and low reflectance. Materials commonly used for beam blocks include certain types of acrylic paint, carbon nanotubes, anodized aluminum, and nickel-phosphate coatings.

=== Beam traps ===
Beam traps are used when it is important that there is no reflectance. Beam traps can incorporate materials used for beam blocks in their design to further reduce the possibility of reflectance.

=== Charged-particle beam dumps ===
The purpose of a charged-particle beam dump is to safely absorb a beam of charged particles such as electrons, protons, nuclei, or ions. This is necessary when, for example, a circular particle accelerator has to be shut down. Dealing with the heat deposited can be an issue, since the energies of the beams to be absorbed can run into the megajoules.

An example of a charged-particle beam dump is the one used by CERN for the Super Proton Synchrotron. Currently, the SPS uses a beam dump that consists of graphite, molybdenum, and tungsten surrounded by concrete, marble, and cast-iron shielding.

== Beam dump experiments ==
Beam dumps used as target for particle physics experiments, for example the Hall A beam dump of Jefferson Lab.
