= Stable massive particles =

Hypothetical dark matter particle

Stable massive particles (SMPs) are hypothetical particles that are long-lived and have appreciable mass. The precise definition varies depending on the different experimental or observational searches. SMPs may be defined as being at least as massive as electrons, and not decaying during its passage through a detector. They can be neutral or charged or carry a fractional charge, and interact with matter through gravitational force, strong force, weak force, electromagnetic force or any unknown force.

If new SMPs are ever discovered, several questions related to the origin and constituent of dark matter, and about the unification of four fundamental forces may be answered.

== Collider experiments ==
Heavy, exotic particles interacting with matter and which can be directly detected through collider experiments are termed as stable massive particles or SMPs. More specifically a SMP is defined to be a particle that can pass through a detector without decaying and can undergo electromagnetic or strong interaction with matter. Searches for SMPs have been carried out across a spectrum of collision experiments such as lepton–hadron, hadron–hadron, and electron–positron. Although none of these experiments have detected an SMP, they have put substantial constraints on the nature of SMPs.

=== ATLAS Experiment ===
During the proton–proton collisions with center of mass energy equal to 13 TeV at the ATLAS experiment, a search for charged SMPs was carried out. In this case SMPs were defined as particles with mass significantly more than that of standard model particles, sufficient lifetime to reach the ATLAS hadronic calorimeter and with measurable electric charge while it passes through the tracking chambers.

=== MoEDAL experiment ===
The MoEDAL experiment search for, among others, highly ionizing SMPs and pseudo-SMPs.

== Non-collider experiments ==
In the case of the non-collider experiments, SMPs are defined as sufficiently long-lived particles which exist either as relics of the big bang singularity or are the products of secondary collisions, and are beyond the range of any conceivable accelerator experiment.
