= Goldstino =

Nambu–Goldstone fermion

The goldstino is the Nambu–Goldstone fermion emerging in the spontaneous breaking of supersymmetry. It is the close fermionic analog of the Nambu–Goldstone bosons controlling the spontaneous breakdown of ordinary bosonic symmetries.

As in the case of Goldstone bosons, it is massless, unless there is, in addition, a small explicit supersymmetry breakdown involved, on top of the basic spontaneous breakdown; in this case it develops a small mass, analogous to that of the pseudo-Goldstone bosons in chiral symmetry breaking.

In theories where supersymmetry is a global symmetry, the goldstino is an ordinary particle (possibly the lightest supersymmetric particle, responsible for dark matter).

In theories where supersymmetry is a local symmetry, the goldstino is absorbed by the gravitino, the gauge field it couples to, becoming its longitudinal component, and giving it nonvanishing mass. This mechanism is a close analog of the way the Higgs field gives nonzero mass to the W and Z bosons.

Vestigial bosonic superpartners of the goldstinos, called sgoldstinos, might also appear, but need not, as supermultiplets have been reduced to arrays. In effect, spontaneous breaking of supersymmetry, by definition, implies a nonlinear realization of the supersymmetry in the Nambu−Goldstone mode, in which the goldstino couples identically to all particles in these arrays, and is thus the superpartner of all of them, equally.
