= Carl H. Brans =

American mathematical physicist (1935–2026)

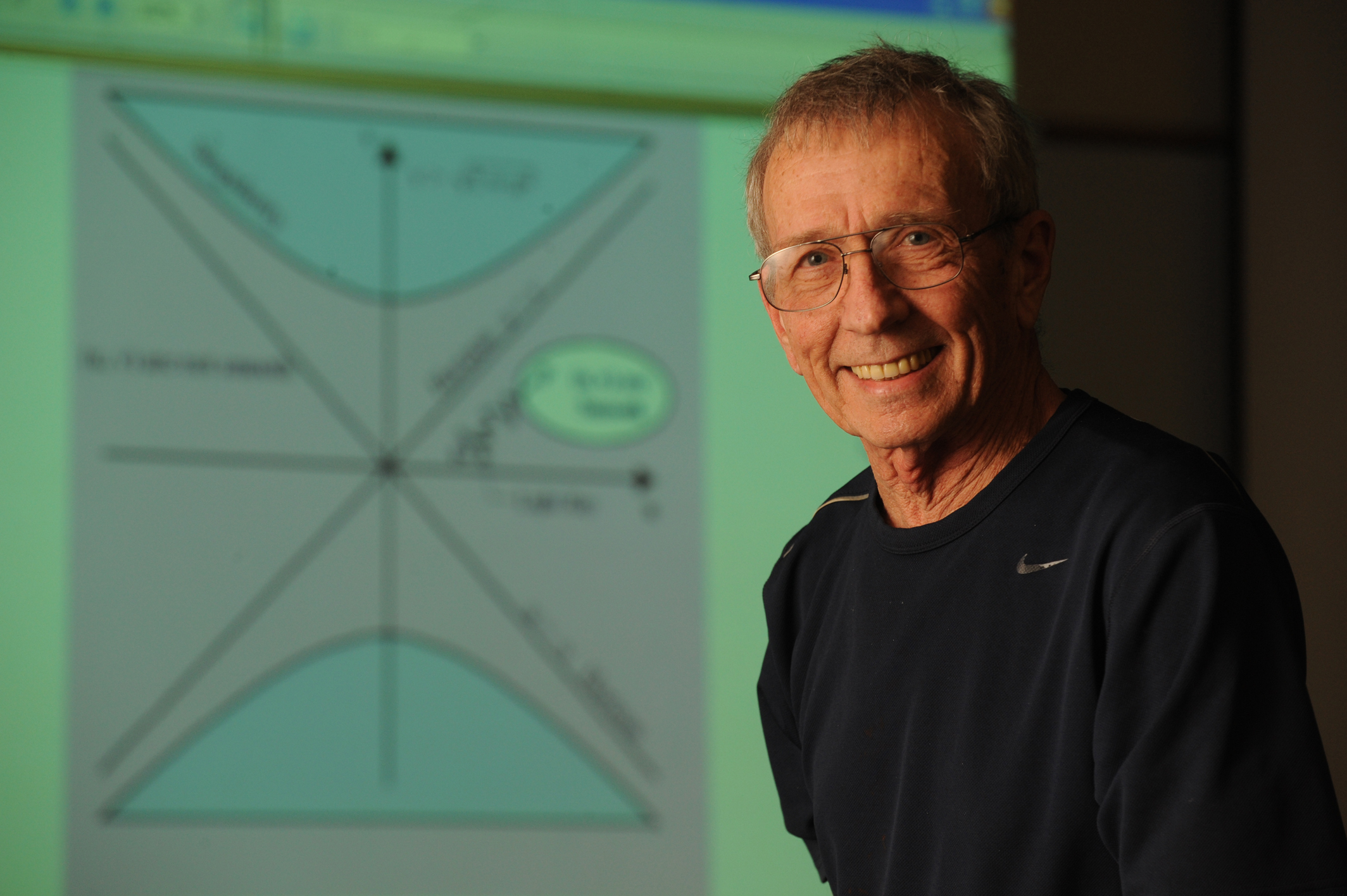
- Born: December 13, 1935; Dallas, Texas, U.S.
- Died: February 26, 2026 (aged 90)
- Education: Princeton University
- Known for: Brans–Dicke theory
- Spouse: Anna Dora Monteiro (m. 1957)
- Scientific career
- Fields: General relativity and mathematical physics
- Workplaces: Loyola University New Orleans
- Doctoral advisor: Robert H. Dicke; Charles W. Misner

Carl Henry Brans (/brænz/; December 13, 1935 – February 26, 2026) was an American mathematical physicist best known for his research into the theoretical underpinnings of gravitation elucidated in his most widely publicized work, the Brans–Dicke theory.

== Life and career ==
A Texan, born in Dallas, Carl Brans spent his academic career in neighboring Louisiana, graduating in 1957 from Loyola University New Orleans. Having obtained his Ph.D. from Princeton University in 1961, he returned to Loyola in 1960 and later became the J.C. Carter Distinguished Professor of Theoretical Physics. Since then, he has held visiting professorships at Princeton University, the Institute for Advanced Study, and the Institute for Theoretical Physics at the University of Cologne, Germany.

Brans was well known among those engaged in the study of gravity and is noted for his development, with Robert H. Dicke of the Brans–Dicke theory of gravitation in which the gravitational constant varies with time, a leading competitor of Albert Einstein's theory of general relativity. The work of Brans and Dicke actually was closely related to earlier work of Pascual Jordan, but was developed independently. This formulation is often referred to as the Jordan–Brans–Dicke (JBD) scalar–tensor theory of gravity. In this theory, based on speculations of Mach, Eddington, Dirac and others, a universally coupled scalar field, in addition to the metric, is introduced which ultimately results in a theory in which the gravitational constant depends on the distribution of matter in the universe. A number of very accurate measurements made in the late 1970s has indicated that JBD fares no better than the simpler standard Einstein General Relativity, in the Solar System context. However, developments in string theory and in inflationary cosmology have renewed interest in scalar field modifications of standard general relativity, although not in the original JBD form.

In the 1960s and 1970s, Brans developed a complete and effective invariant classification of four dimensional Ricci flat geometries, a type of post-Petrov approach, developing very early computer programs for symbolic manipulations. He summarized this work in terms of the complexification of the two-form fiber over space-time. He also worked on certain questions related to the apparently circular argument in proofs of Bell's theorem in which the hidden variables are a priori assumed to not influence detector settings, denying hidden variable causality from the beginning.

From the 1980s on, Brans has considered certain developments in differential topology concerning the existence of exotic (non-standard) global differential structures and their possible applications to physics. This work includes looking at the exotic 7-sphere of John Milnor as an exotic Yang–Mills bundle, and most especially the infinity of exotic differential structure on Euclidean four space (exotic R^{4}) as alternative models for space-time in general relativity. Much of this work has been done in collaboration with Torsten Asselmeyer-Maluga of Berlin. In particular, they proposed that exotic smoothness structures can resolve some of the problems in cosmology like dark matter or dark energy. Together they published a book, Exotic Smoothness and Physics, in 2007.

Brans died on February 26, 2026, at the age of 90.
