= Hidden sector =

Hypothetical collections of yet-unobserved quantum fields and particles

In particle physics, the hidden sector, also known as the dark sector, is a hypothetical collection of yet to be observed quantum fields and their corresponding hypothetical particles. The interactions between the hidden sector particles and the Standard Model particles are weak, indirect, and typically mediated through gravity or other new particles. Examples of new hypothetical mediating particles in this class of theories include the dark photon, sterile neutrino, and axion.

In many cases, hidden sectors include a new gauge group that is independent from the Standard Model gauge group. The hidden sectors are commonly predicted by the models from string theory. They have been hypothesised to explain dark matter and supersymmetry breaking, solving the Muon g-2 anomaly and beryllium-8 decay anomaly.

== See also ==
- Fifth force
- Dark energy
- Dark matter
- Dark radiation
- Higgs sector
