= Beryllium-8 =

Isotope of beryllium

General
- Symbol: ^{8}Be
- Names: beryllium-8
- Protons (Z): 4
- Neutrons (N): 4

Nuclide data
- Natural abundance: 0 (Note: ^{8}Be does not occur naturally on Earth, but it exists in secular equilibrium in the cores of helium-burning stars.)
- Half-life (t_{1/2}): (8.19±0.37)×10^{−17} s
- Isotope mass: 8.00530510(4) Da
- Spin: 0
- Decay products: ^{4}He

Decay modes
- Decay mode: Decay energy (MeV)
- α: 0.09184(4)

Beryllium-8 (^{8}Be, Be-8) is a radionuclide with 4 neutrons and 4 protons. It is an unbound resonance of two alpha particles and nominally an isotope of beryllium. This has important ramifications in stellar nucleosynthesis as it creates a bottleneck in the creation of heavier chemical elements.

== Discovery ==
The discovery of beryllium-8 occurred shortly after the construction of the first particle accelerator in 1932. Physicists John Douglas Cockcroft and Ernest Walton performed their first experiment with their accelerator at the Cavendish Laboratory in Cambridge, in which they irradiated lithium-7 with protons. They reported that this populated a nucleus with A = 8 that near-instantaneously decays into two alpha particles. This activity was observed again several months later, and was inferred to originate from ^{8}Be.

== Properties ==
Triple-alpha process

Beryllium-8 is unbound with respect to alpha emission by 92 keV; it is a resonance having a width of 6 eV. The nucleus of helium-4 is particularly stable, having a doubly magic configuration and larger binding energy per nucleon than ^{8}Be. As the total energy of ^{8}Be is greater than that of two alpha particles, the decay into two alpha particles is energetically favorable, and the synthesis of ^{8}Be from two ^{4}He nuclei is endothermic. The decay of ^{8}Be is facilitated by the structure of the ^{8}Be nucleus; it is highly deformed, and is believed to be a molecule-like cluster of two alpha particles that are very easily separated. Furthermore, while other alpha nuclides have similar short-lived resonances, ^{8}Be is exceptionally already in the ground state. The unbound system of two α-particles has a low-energy Coulomb barrier, which makes it unable to exist for any significant length of time: its half-life is about 8.2×10^{−17} seconds.

Beryllium-8 is the only unstable nuclide with the same even number ≤ 20 of protons and neutrons. It is also one of the only two unstable nuclides (the other is helium-5) with mass number ≤ 143 which are stable to both beta decay and double beta decay.

There are also several excited states of ^{8}Be, all short-lived resonances – having widths up to several MeV and varying isospins – that quickly decay to the ground state or into two alpha particles. A 2015 experiment with excited ^{8}Be suggested the existence of the X17 particle.

== Role in stellar nucleosynthesis ==
In stellar nucleosynthesis, two helium-4 nuclei may collide and fuse into a single beryllium-8 nucleus. Beryllium-8 has an extremely short life before reverting to two helium-4 nuclei, but can still exist in a useful equilibrium concentration. This, along with the unbound nature of ^{5}He and ^{5}Li, creates a bottleneck in Big Bang nucleosynthesis and stellar nucleosynthesis, for it necessitates a very fast reaction rate. This impedes formation of heavier elements in the former, and limits the yield in the latter process. If the beryllium-8 collides with a helium-4 nucleus before decaying, they can fuse into a carbon-12 nucleus. This reaction was first theorized independently by Öpik and Salpeter in the early 1950s.

Owing to the instability of ^{8}Be, the triple-alpha process is the only reaction in which ^{12}C and heavier elements may be produced in observed quantities. The triple-alpha process, despite being a three-body reaction, is facilitated when ^{8}Be production increases such that its concentration is approximately 10^{−8} relative to ^{4}He; this occurs when ^{8}Be is produced faster than it decays. However, this alone is insufficient, as the collision between ^{8}Be and ^{4}He will very seldom result in fusion and the reaction rate would still not be fast enough to explain the observed abundance of ^{12}C. In 1954, Fred Hoyle thus postulated the existence of a resonance in carbon-12 within the stellar energy region of the triple-alpha process, enhancing the creation of carbon-12 despite the extremely short half-life of beryllium-8. The existence of this resonance (the Hoyle state) was confirmed experimentally shortly thereafter; its discovery has been cited in formulations of the anthropic principle and the fine-tuned Universe hypothesis.

== Hypothetical universes with stable ^{8}Be ==
As beryllium-8 is unbound by only 92 keV, it is theorized that very small changes in nuclear potential and the fine tuning of certain constants (such as α, the fine structure constant), could sufficiently increase the binding energy of ^{8}Be to prevent its alpha decay, thus making it stable. This has led to investigations of hypothetical scenarios in which ^{8}Be is stable and speculation about other universes with different fundamental constants. These studies suggest that the disappearance of the bottleneck created by ^{8}Be would result in a very different reaction mechanism in Big Bang nucleosynthesis and the triple-alpha process, as well as alter the abundances of heavier chemical elements. As Big Bang nucleosynthesis only occurred within a short period having the necessary conditions, it is thought that there would be no significant difference in carbon production even if ^{8}Be were stable. However, stable ^{8}Be would enable alternative reaction pathways in helium burning (such as ^{8}Be + ^{4}He and ^{8}Be + ^{8}Be; constituting a "beryllium burning" phase) and possibly affect the abundance of the resultant ^{12}C, ^{16}O, and heavier nuclei, though ^{1}H and ^{4}He would remain the most abundant nuclides. This would also affect stellar evolution through an earlier onset and faster rate of helium burning (and beryllium burning), and result in a different main sequence than our Universe.

== Notes ==
Lighter: beryllium-7	Beryllium-8 is an isotope of beryllium	Heavier: beryllium-9
Decay product of: carbon-9 (β^{+}, p) boron-8 (β^{+}) lithium-8 (β^{−})	Decay chain of beryllium-8	Decays to: helium-4 (α)
