= Dilaton =

Hypothetical particle

In particle physics, the hypothetical dilaton is a particle of a scalar field $\varphi$ that appears in theories with extra dimensions when the volume of the compactified dimensions varies. It appears as a radion in Kaluza–Klein theory's compactifications of extra dimensions. In Brans–Dicke theory of gravity, Newton's constant is not presumed to be constant but instead 1/G is replaced by a scalar field $\varphi$ and the associated particle is the dilaton.

== Exposition ==
In Kaluza–Klein theories, after dimensional reduction, the effective Planck mass varies as some power of the volume of compactified space. This is why volume can turn out as a dilaton in the lower-dimensional effective theory.

Although string theory naturally incorporates Kaluza–Klein theory that first introduced the dilaton, perturbative string theories such as type I string theory, type II string theory, and heterotic string theory already contain the dilaton in the maximal number of 10 dimensions. However, M-theory in 11 dimensions does not include the dilaton in its spectrum unless compactified. The dilaton in type IIA string theory parallels the radion of M-theory compactified over a circle, and the dilaton in E_{8} × E_{8} string theory parallels the radion for the Hořava–Witten model. (For more on the M-theory origin of the dilaton, see Berman & Perry (2006).)

In string theory, there is also a dilaton in the worldsheet CFT – two-dimensional conformal field theory. The exponential of its vacuum expectation value determines the coupling constant g and the Euler characteristic χ = 2 − 2g as $\; \tfrac{1}{2\pi} \int R = \chi \;$ for compact worldsheets by the Gauss–Bonnet theorem, where the genus g counts the number of handles and thus the number of loops or string interactions described by a specific worldsheet.

$$g = \exp \left( \langle \varphi \rangle \right)$$

Therefore, the dynamic variable coupling constant in string theory contrasts the quantum field theory where it is constant. As long as supersymmetry is unbroken, such scalar fields can take arbitrary values moduli. However, supersymmetry breaking usually creates a potential energy for the scalar fields and the scalar fields localize near a minimum whose position should in principle calculate in string theory.

The dilaton acts like a Brans–Dicke scalar, with the effective Planck scale depending upon both the string scale and the dilaton field.

In supersymmetry the superpartner of the dilaton or here the dilatino, combines with the axion to form a complex scalar field.

== The dilaton in quantum gravity ==
The dilaton made its first appearance in Kaluza–Klein theory, a five-dimensional theory that combined gravitation and electromagnetism. It appears in string theory. However, it has become central to the lower-dimensional many-bodied gravity problem based on the field theoretic approach of Roman Jackiw. The impetus arose from the fact that complete analytical solutions for the metric of a covariant N-body system have proven elusive in general relativity. To simplify the problem, the number of dimensions was lowered to 1 + 1 – one spatial dimension and one temporal dimension. This model problem, known as R = T theory, as opposed to the general G = T theory, was amenable to exact solutions in terms of a generalization of the Lambert W function. Also, the field equation governing the dilaton, derived from differential geometry, as the Schrödinger equation could be amenable to quantization.

This combines gravity, quantization, and even the electromagnetic interaction, promising ingredients of a fundamental physical theory. This outcome revealed a previously unknown and already existing natural link between general relativity and quantum mechanics. There lacks clarity in the generalization of this theory to 3 + 1 dimensions. However, a recent derivation in 3 + 1 dimensions under the right coordinate conditions yields a formulation similar to the earlier 1 + 1, a dilaton field governed by the logarithmic Schrödinger equation that is seen in condensed matter physics and superfluids. The field equations are amenable to such a generalization, as shown with the inclusion of a one-graviton process, and yield the correct Newtonian limit in d dimensions, but only with a dilaton. Furthermore, some speculate on the view of the apparent resemblance between the dilaton and the Higgs boson. However, there needs more experimentation to resolve the relationship between these two particles. Finally, since this theory can combine gravitational, electromagnetic, and quantum effects, their coupling could potentially lead to a means of testing the theory through cosmology and experimentation.

== Dilaton action ==
The dilaton-gravity action is

$$\int d^Dx \, \sqrt{-g} \left[ \frac{1}{2\kappa} \left( \Phi R - \omega\left[ \Phi \right]\frac{g^{\mu\nu}\partial_\mu \Phi \partial_\nu \Phi}{\Phi} \right) - V[\Phi] \right].$$

This is more general than Brans–Dicke in vacuum in that we have a dilaton potential.

== See also ==
- CGHS model
- R = T model
- Quantum gravity
- List of hypothetical particles
