= Brans–Dicke theory =

Proposed theory of gravitation

In physics, the Brans–Dicke theory of gravitation (sometimes called the Jordan–Brans–Dicke theory) is a competitor to Einstein's general theory of relativity. It is an example of a scalar–tensor theory, a gravitational theory in which the gravitational interaction is mediated by a scalar field as well as the tensor field of general relativity. The gravitational constant $G$ is not presumed to be constant but instead $1 / G$ is replaced by a scalar field $\phi$ which can vary from place to place and with time.

The theory was developed in 1961 by Robert H. Dicke and Carl H. Brans building upon, among others, the earlier 1959 work of Pascual Jordan. At present, both Brans–Dicke theory and general relativity are generally held to be in agreement with observation. Brans–Dicke theory represents a minority viewpoint in physics.

== Comparison with general relativity ==
Both Brans–Dicke theory and general relativity are examples of a class of relativistic classical field theories of gravitation, called metric theories. In these theories, spacetime is equipped with a metric tensor, $g_{ab}$, and the gravitational field is represented (in whole or in part) by the Riemann curvature tensor $R_{abcd}$, which is determined by the metric tensor.

All metric theories satisfy the Einstein equivalence principle, which in modern geometric language states that in a very small region (too small to exhibit measurable curvature effects), all the laws of physics known in special relativity are valid in local Lorentz frames. This implies in turn that metric theories all exhibit the gravitational redshift effect.

As in general relativity, the source of the gravitational field is considered to be the stress–energy tensor or matter tensor. However, the way in which the immediate presence of mass-energy in some region affects the gravitational field in that region differs from general relativity. So does the way in which spacetime curvature affects the motion of matter. In the Brans–Dicke theory, in addition to the metric, which is a rank two tensor field, there is a scalar field, $\phi$, which has the physical effect of changing the effective gravitational constant from place to place. (This feature was actually a key desideratum of Dicke and Brans; see the paper by Brans cited below, which sketches the origins of the theory.)

The field equations of Brans–Dicke theory contain a parameter, $\omega$, called the Brans–Dicke coupling constant. This is a true dimensionless constant which must be chosen once and for all. However, it can be chosen to fit observations. Such parameters are often called tunable parameters. In addition, the present ambient value of the effective gravitational constant must be chosen as a boundary condition. General relativity contains no dimensionless parameters whatsoever, and therefore is easier to falsify (show whether false) than Brans–Dicke theory. Theories with tunable parameters are sometimes deprecated on the principle that, of two theories which both agree with observation, the more parsimonious is preferable. On the other hand, it seems as though they are a necessary feature of some theories, such as the weak mixing angle of the Standard Model.

Brans–Dicke theory is "less stringent" than general relativity in another sense: it admits more solutions. In particular, exact vacuum solutions to the Einstein field equation of general relativity, augmented by the trivial scalar field $\phi=1$, become exact vacuum solutions in Brans–Dicke theory, but some spacetimes which are not vacuum solutions to the Einstein field equation become, with the appropriate choice of scalar field, vacuum solutions of Brans–Dicke theory. Similarly, an important class of spacetimes, the pp-wave metrics, are also exact null dust solutions of both general relativity and Brans–Dicke theory, but here too, Brans–Dicke theory allows additional wave solutions having geometries which are incompatible with general relativity.

Like general relativity, Brans–Dicke theory predicts light deflection and the precession of perihelia of planets orbiting the Sun. However, the precise formulas which govern these effects, according to Brans–Dicke theory, depend upon the value of the coupling constant $\omega$. This means that it is possible to set an observational lower bound on the possible value of $\omega$ from observations of the Solar System and other gravitational systems. The value of $\omega$ consistent with experiment has risen with time. In 1973 $\omega > 5$ was consistent with known data. By 1981 $\omega > 30$ was consistent with known data. In 2003 evidence – derived from the Cassini–Huygens experiment – shows that the value of $\omega$ must exceed 40,000.

It is also often taught that general relativity is obtained from the Brans–Dicke theory in the limit $\omega \rightarrow \infty$. But Faraoni claims that this breaks down when the trace of the stress-energy momentum vanishes, i.e. $T^{\mu}_{\mu} = 0$, an example of which is the Campanelli–Lousto wormhole solution. Some have argued that only general relativity satisfies the strong equivalence principle.

== The field equations ==
The field equations of the Brans–Dicke theory are

$$G_{ab} = \frac{8\pi}{\phi} T_{ab} + \frac{\omega}{\phi^2}
\left(\partial_a\phi \partial_b\phi - \frac{1}{2} g_{ab} \partial_c\phi\partial^c\phi\right)
+ \frac{1}{\phi}(\nabla_a\nabla_b\phi - g_{ab} \Box\phi) - g_{ab}\frac{V(\phi)}{2\phi},$$

$$\Box\phi = \frac{8\pi}{3+2\omega}T + \frac{2V(\phi) - \phi V'(\phi)}{3+2\omega}$$

where

$\omega$ is the dimensionless Dicke coupling constant;
$g_{ab}$ is the metric tensor;
$G_{ab} = R_{ab} - \tfrac{1}{2} R g_{ab}$ is the Einstein tensor, a kind of average curvature;
$R_{ab} = R^m{}_{a m b}$ is the Ricci tensor, a kind of trace of the curvature tensor;
$R = R^m{}_{m}$ is the Ricci scalar, the trace of the Ricci tensor;
$T_{ab}$ is the stress–energy tensor;
$T = T_a^a$ is the trace of the stress–energy tensor;
$\phi$ is the scalar field;
$V(\phi)$ is the scalar potential;
$V'(\phi)$ is the derivative of the scalar potential with respect to $\phi$;
$\Box$ is the Laplace–Beltrami operator or covariant wave operator, $\Box \phi = \phi^{;a}{}_{;a}$.

The first equation describes how the stress–energy tensor and scalar field $\phi$ together affect spacetime curvature. The left-hand side, the Einstein tensor, can be thought of as a kind of average curvature. It is a matter of pure mathematics that, in any metric theory, the Riemann tensor can always be written as the sum of the Weyl curvature (or conformal curvature tensor) and a piece constructed from the Einstein tensor.

The second equation says that the trace of the stress–energy tensor acts as the source for the scalar field $\phi$. Since electromagnetic fields contribute only a traceless term to the stress–energy tensor, this implies that in a region of spacetime containing only an electromagnetic field (plus the gravitational field), the right-hand side vanishes, and $\phi$ obeys the (curved spacetime) wave equation. Therefore, changes in $\phi$ propagate through electrovacuum regions; in this sense, we say that $\phi$ is a long-range field.

For comparison, the field equation of general relativity is simply

$$G_{ab} = 8 \pi T_{ab}.$$

This means that in general relativity, the Einstein curvature at some event is entirely determined by the stress–energy tensor at that event; the other piece, the Weyl curvature, is the part of the gravitational field which can propagate as a gravitational wave across a vacuum region. But in the Brans–Dicke theory, the Einstein tensor is determined partly by the immediate presence of mass–energy and momentum, and partly by the long-range scalar field $\phi$.

The vacuum field equations of both theories are obtained when the stress–energy tensor vanishes. This models situations in which no non-gravitational fields are present.

== The action principle ==
The following Lagrangian contains the complete description of the Brans–Dicke theory:

$$S = \frac{1}{16 \pi}\int d^4x\sqrt{-g}
\left(\phi R - \frac{\omega}{\phi}\partial_a\phi\partial^a\phi\right) + \int d^4 x \sqrt{-g} \,\mathcal{L}_\mathrm{M},$$

where $g$ is the determinant of the metric, $\sqrt{-g} \, d^4 x$ is the four-dimensional volume form, and $\mathcal{L}_\mathrm{M}$ is the matter term, or matter Lagrangian density.

The matter term includes the contribution of ordinary matter (e.g. gaseous matter) and also electromagnetic fields. In a vacuum region, the matter term vanishes identically; the remaining term is the gravitational term. To obtain the vacuum field equations, we must vary the gravitational term in the Lagrangian with respect to the metric $g_{ab}$; this gives the first field equation above. When we vary with respect to the scalar field $\phi$, we obtain the second field equation.

Note that, unlike for the General Relativity field equations, the $\delta R_{ab}/\delta g_{cd}$ term does not vanish, as the result is not a total derivative. It can be shown that

$$\frac{\delta(\phi R)}{\delta g^{ab}} = \phi R_{ab} + g_{ab}g^{cd}\phi_{;c;d} - \phi_{;a;b}.$$

To prove this result, use

$$\delta (\phi R) = R \delta \phi + \phi R_{mn} \delta g^{mn} + \phi \nabla_s (g^{mn} \delta\Gamma^s_{nm} - g^{ms}\delta\Gamma^r_{rm} ).$$

By evaluating the $\delta\Gamma$s in Riemann normal coordinates, 6 individual terms vanish. 6 further terms combine when manipulated using Stokes' theorem to provide the desired $(g_{ab}g^{cd}\phi_{;c;d} - \phi_{;a;b})\delta g^{ab}$.

For comparison, the Lagrangian defining general relativity is

$$S = \int d^4x \sqrt{-g} \, \left(\frac{R}{16\pi G} + \mathcal{L}_\mathrm{M}\right).$$

Varying the gravitational term with respect to $g_{ab}$ gives the vacuum Einstein field equation.

In both theories, the full field equations can be obtained by variations of the full Lagrangian.

== See also ==
- Classical theories of gravitation
- Dilaton
- General relativity
- Mach's principle
- Scientific importance of GW170817
