= Strongly interacting massive particle =

Hypothetical particle

A strongly interacting massive particle (SIMP) is a hypothetical particle that interacts strongly between themselves and weakly with ordinary matter, but could form the inferred dark matter despite this.

Strongly interacting massive particles have been proposed as a solution for the ultra-high-energy cosmic-ray problem and the absence of cooling flows in galactic clusters.

Various experiments and observations have set constraints on SIMP dark matter from 1990 onward.

SIMP annihilations would produce significant heat. DAMA set limits with NaI(Tl) crystals.

Measurements of Uranus's heat excess exclude SIMPs from 150 MeV to 10^{4} GeV. Earth's heat flow significantly constrains any cross section.

== See also ==
- Weakly interacting massive particles – Hypothetical particles that may constitute dark matter
- Self-interacting dark matter – Hypothetical form of dark matter
- Massive compact halo object – Hypothetical form of dark matter in galactic halos
