= ATOMKI =

Nuclear research institute of the Hungarian Academy of Sciences

Coordinates: 47.54369819601174°N 21.625223951786353°E

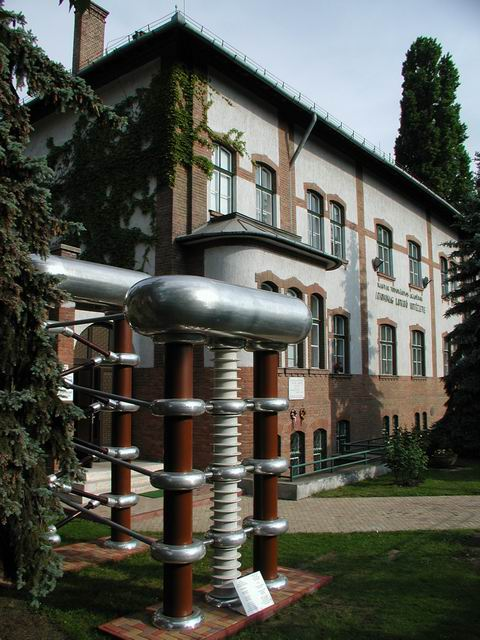
ATOMKI main entrance

ATOMKI is the Institute for Nuclear Research, Hungarian Academy of Sciences. The institute is located in Debrecen and was established in 1954 by Sándor Szalay, the founding director.

ATOMKI became independent from the Institute of Experimental Physics of the Kossuth Lajos University (presently called University of Debrecen), where Sándor Szalay started and directed nuclear physics research for decades. At present, the main research fields of Atomki are atom-, nuclear-, and particle physics, ion beam analytics, technique of detection and signal processing, environmental analytics, radioactive dating, radiochemistry, and solid state physics. The director is Zsolt Dombrádi, D.Sc.

Some of its buildings were originally the National Orphanage for Teachers' Children, built in 1917.

Accelerators of ATOMKI (Lovas, 2004)
When	Type	Purpose
1961–1978	800 kV cascade accelerator	nuclear reactions
1978–1992	same	electron-atom collisions
1961–1984	300 kV neutron generator	neutron physics
1971-	1 MV Van de Graaff-accelerator	atomic collisions
1971-	5 MV Van de Graaff-accelerator	nuclear physics astrophysics analytics atomic collisions
1985-	cyclotron (~18 MeV for proton)	nuclear physics production of isotopes testing of materials
1997-	electron-cyclotron resonance ion source	plasma physics atomic physics
2013	Discovery of neutrino particle	atomic physics nuclear physics
2014-	Tandetron	nuclear physics

== See also ==
- X17 particle
