= Dark photon =

Hypothetical force carrier particle connected to dark matter

The dark photon (also hidden, heavy, para-, or secluded photon) is a hypothetical hidden sector particle, proposed as a force carrier similar to the photon of electromagnetism but associated to dark matter. In a minimal scenario, this new force can be introduced by extending the gauge group of the Standard Model of Particle Physics with a new abelian U(1) gauge symmetry. The corresponding new spin-1 gauge boson (i.e., the dark photon) can then couple very weakly to electrically charged particles through kinetic mixing with the ordinary photon and could thus be detected. The dark photon can also interact with the Standard Model if some of the fermions are charged under the new abelian group. The possible charging arrangements are restricted by a number of consistency requirements such as anomaly cancellation and constraints coming from Yukawa matrices.

== Motivation ==
Observations of gravitational effects that cannot be explained by visible matter alone imply the existence of matter which does not couple or only very weakly couples to the known forces of nature. This dark matter dominates the matter density of the universe, but its particles (if there are any) have eluded direct and indirect detection so far. Given the rich interaction structure of the well-known Standard Model particles, which make up only the subdominant component of the universe, it is natural to think about a similarly interactive behaviour of dark sector particles. Dark photons could be part of these interactions among dark matter particles and provide a non-gravitational window (a so-called vector portal) into their existence by kinematically mixing with the Standard Model photon.

Further motivation for the search for dark photons comes from several observed anomalies in astrophysics (e.g., in cosmic rays) that could be related to dark matter interacting with a dark photon.

Arguably the most interesting application of dark photons arises in the explanation of the discrepancy between the measured and the calculated anomalous magnetic moment of the muon, although the simplest realisations of this idea are now in conflict with other experimental data. This discrepancy is usually thought of as a persisting hint for physics beyond the Standard Model and should be accounted for by general new physics models. Beside the effect on electromagnetism via kinetic mixing and possible interactions with dark matter particles, dark photons (if massive) can also play the role of a dark matter candidate themselves. This is theoretically possible through the misalignment mechanism.

== Theory ==
Adding a sector containing dark photons to the Lagrangian of the Standard Model can be done in a straightforward and minimal way by introducing a new U(1) gauge field. The specifics of the interaction between this new field, potential new particle content (e.g., a Dirac fermion for dark matter) and the Standard Model particles are virtually only limited by the creativity of the theorist and the constraints that have already been put on certain kinds of couplings. The arguably most popular basic model involves a single new broken U(1) gauge symmetry and kinetic mixing between the corresponding dark photon field $A^{\prime}$ and the Standard Model hypercharge fields. The operator at play is $F_{\mu\nu}^\prime B^{\mu\nu}$, where $F_{\mu\nu}^{\prime}$ is the field strength tensor of the dark photon field and $B^{\mu\nu}$ denotes the field strength tensor of the Standard Model weak hypercharge fields. This term arises naturally by writing down all terms allowed by the gauge symmetry. After electroweak symmetry breaking and diagonalising the terms containing the field strength tensors (kinetic terms) by redefining the fields, the relevant terms in the Lagrangian are

$$\mathcal{L}\supset-\frac{1}{4}F^{\prime\mu\nu}F^{\prime}_{\mu\nu}+\frac{1}{2}m_{A^\prime}^{2}A^{\prime\mu}A^{\prime}_\mu+\epsilon e A^{\prime\mu}J_{\mu}^{EM}$$

where $m_{A^\prime}$ is the mass of the dark photon (in this case it can be thought of as being generated by the Higgs or Stueckelberg mechanism), $\epsilon$ is the parameter describing the kinetic mixing strength and $J_{\mu}^{EM}$ denotes the electromagnetic current with its coupling $e$. The fundamental parameters of this model are thus the mass of the dark photon and the strength of the kinetic mixing. Other models leave the new U(1) gauge symmetry unbroken, resulting in a massless dark photon carrying a long-range interaction. The incorporation of new Dirac fermions as dark matter particles in this theory is uncomplicated and can be achieved by simply adding the Dirac terms to the Lagrangian. A massless dark photon, however, will be fully decoupled from the Standard Model and will not have any experimental consequence by itself. If there is an additional particle in the model which was originally interacting with the dark photon, it will become a millicharged particle which could be directly searched for.

== Experiments ==
=== Direct conversion ===
Constraints on the dark photon's kinetic mixing parameter

A massive dark photon candidate with kinetic mixing strength $\epsilon$ could spontaneously convert to a Standard Model photon. A cavity, with resonant frequency tuned to match the mass of a dark photon candidate $hf = m_{A^\prime}c^2$, can be used to capture the resulting photon.

One technique to detect the presence of signal photon in the cavity is to amplify the cavity field with a quantum limited amplifier. This method is prevalent in the search for axion dark matter. With linear amplification, however, is difficult to overcome the effective noise imposed by the standard quantum limit and search for dark photon candidates that would produce a mean cavity population much less than 1 photon.

By counting the number of photons in the cavity, it is possible to subvert the quantum limit. This technique has been demonstrated by researchers at the University of Chicago in collaboration with Fermilab. The experiment has excluded dark photon candidates with mass centered around 24.86 μeV and $\epsilon \geq 1.68 \times 10^{-15}$ by using a superconducting qubit to repeatedly measure the same photon. This has enabled a search speed up of over 1,000 as compared to the conventional linear amplification technique.

=== Accelerator searches ===
For a dark photon mass above the MeV, current limits are dominated by experiments based in particle accelerators. Assuming that dark photons produced in the collisions would then decay mainly into positron-electron pairs, the experiments search for an excess of electron-positron pairs that would originate from the dark photon decay. On average, experimental results now indicate that this hypothetical particle must interact with electrons at least a thousand times more feebly than the standard photon.

In more details, for a dark photon which would be more massive than a proton (thus with mass larger than a GeV), the best limits would arise from collider experiments. While several experimental apparatus have been leveraged in the search for this particle, some notable examples are the BaBar experiment, or the LHCb and CMS experiments at the LHC. For dark photon of intermediary masses (roughly between the electron and proton masses), the best constraints arise from fixed target experiments. As an example, the Heavy Photon Search (HPS) experiment at Jefferson Lab collides multi-GeV electrons with a tungsten target foil in searching for this particle.

== See also ==
- Dark radiation – Postulated type of radiation that mediates interactions of dark matter
- Dual photon – Hypothetical particle dual to the photon
- Fifth force – Speculative physics theory
- Millicharged particles
- Light dark matter
- Photino – Hypothetical superpartner of the photon
