= Parameterized post-Newtonian formalism =

Approximation method for general relativity in physics

In physics, the parameterized post-Newtonian formalism or PPN formalism, is a version of the post-Newtonian approximation to theory of general relativity which includes adjustable parameters. It is used as a tool to compare non-linear Einsteinian gravity to simpler Newtonian gravity in the limit in which the gravitational field is weak and generated by objects moving slowly compared to the speed of light. In general, PPN formalism can be applied to all metric theories of gravitation in which all bodies satisfy the Einstein equivalence principle (EEP). The speed of light remains constant in PPN formalism and it assumes that the metric tensor is always symmetric.

== Post-Newtonian approximations ==
Einstein's equations of gravity are non-linear and difficult to solve even in very simple systems. A post-Newtonian expansion rewrites the equations in a series of terms proportional to a power of a small physical ratio. For example, the ratio of the velocity of the matter forming the gravitational field, $v$ to the speed of light, $c$ which in this case is better called the speed of gravity. As long as $v/c \ll 1$, the terms in a series with powers like $(v/c)^{i}$ will have only a few important terms. The lowest order term will be Newton's law of universal gravitation. This allows approximations to Einstein's equations to be made in the case of weak fields. Higher-order terms can be added to increase accuracy, but for strong fields, it may be preferable to solve the complete equations numerically.

== Parameterization ==
The Parameterized post-Newtonian (PPN) formulation alters the basic post-Newtonian equations by replacing the numerical coefficients with adjustable parameters. Different values of the parameters create different theories of gravity suitable for different circumstances. Examples include models of the Solar System using point particle planets, systems of point masses with electric charge, and fluids with anisotropic stresses.

== Static isotropic spacetime example ==
A simple model of the Solar System uses only the gravity of the Sun and ignores its rotation. This isotropic and static spacetime would have distances known as proper time measured by the metric:
$$ds^2 = -A(r) dt^2 + B(r) dr^2 + r^2 d\Omega^2.$$
Here $r$ is the distance from the Sun to a test mass and $t$ is coordinate time of an observer at the test mass. The character of the functions A and B can be deduced by dimensional and physical analysis. The overall system depends upon the Sun's mass, M and the gravitational constant G, in the combination GM. The ratio of the gravitational potential energy to rest mass of the test particle, $(GM/c^2r) \ll 1,$ is small so the two functions can be expanded in a power series of that small ratio:
$$A(r) = 1 - \frac{2GM}{c^2r} + 2(\beta-\gamma)\big (\frac{GM}{c^2r} \big)+ \dots$$
$$B(r) = 1 + 2\gamma\big (\frac{GM}{c^2r} \big)+ \dots$$
The parameters $\beta$ and $\gamma$ are both equal to 1 in Einstein gravity. Solar System tests of general relativity match that value to better than one part in ten thousand. Historically other theories of gravity predicted other values but none have matched observations.

== History ==
The earliest parameterizations of the post-Newtonian approximation were performed by Sir Arthur Stanley Eddington in 1922. However, they dealt solely with the vacuum gravitational field outside an isolated spherical body. Ken Nordtvedt (1968, 1969) expanded this to include seven parameters in papers published in 1968 and 1969. Clifford Martin Will introduced a stressed, continuous matter description of celestial bodies in 1971.

The versions described here are based on Wei-Tou Ni (1972), Will and Nordtvedt (1972), Charles W. Misner et al. (1973) (see Gravitation (book)), and Will (1981, 1993) and have ten parameters.

== Beta-delta notation ==
Ten post-Newtonian parameters completely characterize the weak-field behavior of the theory. The formalism has been a valuable tool in tests of general relativity. In the notation of Will (1971), Ni (1972) and Misner et al. (1973) they have the following values:

$\gamma$	How much space curvature $g_{ij}$ is produced by unit rest mass
$\beta$	How much nonlinearity there is in the superposition law for gravity $g_{00}$
$\beta_1$	How much gravity is produced by unit kinetic energy $\textstyle\frac12\rho_0v^2$
$\beta_2$	How much gravity is produced by unit gravitational potential energy $\rho_0/U$
$\beta_3$	How much gravity is produced by unit internal energy $\rho_0\Pi$
$\beta_4$	How much gravity is produced by unit pressure $p$
$\zeta$	Difference between radial and transverse kinetic energy on gravity
$\eta$	Difference between radial and transverse stress on gravity
$\Delta_1$	How much dragging of inertial frames $g_{0j}$ is produced by unit momentum $\rho_0v$
$\Delta_2$	Difference between radial and transverse momentum on dragging of inertial frames

$g_{\mu\nu}$ is the 4 by 4 symmetric metric tensor with indexes $\mu$ and $\nu$ going from 0 to 3. Below, an index of 0 will indicate the time direction and indices $i$ and $j$ (going from 1 to 3) will indicate spatial directions.

In Einstein's theory, the values of these parameters are chosen (1) to fit Newton's Law of gravity in the limit of velocities and mass approaching zero, (2) to ensure conservation of energy, mass, momentum, and angular momentum, and (3) to make the equations independent of the reference frame. In this notation, general relativity has PPN parameters $\gamma=\beta=\beta_1=\beta_2=\beta_3=\beta_4=\Delta_1=\Delta_2=1$ and $\zeta=\eta=0.$

== Alpha-zeta notation ==
In the more recent notation of Will & Nordtvedt (1972) and Will (1981, 1993, 2006) a different set of ten PPN parameters is used.

$$\gamma=\gamma$$
$$\beta=\beta$$
$$\alpha_1=7\Delta_1+\Delta_2-4\gamma-4$$
$$\alpha_2=\Delta_2+\zeta-1$$
$$\alpha_3=4\beta_1-2\gamma-2-\zeta$$
$$\zeta_1=\zeta$$
$$\zeta_2=2\beta+2\beta_2-3\gamma-1$$
$$\zeta_3=\beta_3-1$$
$$\zeta_4=\beta_4-\gamma$$
$\xi$ is calculated from $3\eta=12\beta-3\gamma-9+10\xi-3\alpha_1+2\alpha_2-2\zeta_1-\zeta_2$

The meaning of these is that $\alpha_1$, $\alpha_2$ and $\alpha_3$ measure the extent of preferred frame effects. $\zeta_1$, $\zeta_2$, $\zeta_3$, $\zeta_4$ and $\alpha_3$ measure the failure of conservation of energy, momentum and angular momentum.

In this notation, general relativity has PPN parameters

$\gamma=\beta=1$ and $\alpha_1=\alpha_2=\alpha_3=\zeta_1=\zeta_2=\zeta_3=\zeta_4=\xi=0$

The mathematical relationship between the metric, metric potentials and PPN parameters for this notation is:

$$\begin{matrix}g_{00} = -1+2U-2\beta U^2-2\xi\Phi_W+(2\gamma+2+\alpha_3+\zeta_1-2\xi)\Phi_1 +2(3\gamma-2\beta+1+\zeta_2+\xi)\Phi_2 \\ \ +2(1+\zeta_3)\Phi_3+2(3\gamma+3\zeta_4-2\xi)\Phi_4-(\zeta_1-2\xi)A-(\alpha_1-\alpha_2-\alpha_3)w^2U \\ \ -\alpha_2w^iw^jU_{ij}+(2\alpha_3-\alpha_1)w^iV_i+O(\epsilon^3) \end{matrix}$$
$$g_{0i}=-\textstyle\frac12(4\gamma+3+\alpha_1-\alpha_2+\zeta_1-2\xi)V_i-\textstyle\frac12(1+\alpha_2-\zeta_1+2\xi)W_i
-\textstyle\frac12(\alpha_1-2\alpha_2)w^iU-\alpha_2w^jU_{ij}+O(\epsilon^{\frac52})$$
$$g_{ij}=(1+2\gamma U)\delta_{ij}+O(\epsilon^2)$$

where repeated indexes are summed. $\epsilon$ is on the order of potentials such as $U$, the square magnitude of the coordinate velocities of matter, etc. $w^i$ is the velocity vector of the PPN coordinate system relative to the mean rest-frame of the universe. $w^2=\delta_{ij}w^iw^j$ is the square magnitude of that velocity. $\delta_{ij}=1$ if and only if $i=j$, $0$ otherwise.

There are ten metric potentials, $U$, $U_{ij}$, $\Phi_W$, $A$, $\Phi_1$, $\Phi_2$, $\Phi_3$, $\Phi_4$, $V_i$ and $W_i$, one for each PPN parameter to ensure a unique solution. 10 linear equations in 10 unknowns are solved by inverting a 10 by 10 matrix. These metric potentials have forms such as:

$$U(\mathbf{x},t)=\int{\rho(\mathbf{x}',t)\over|\mathbf{x}-\mathbf{x}'|}d^3x'$$

which is simply another way of writing the Newtonian gravitational potential,

$$U_{ij}=\int{\rho(\mathbf{x}',t)(x-x')_i(x-x')_j\over|\mathbf{x}-\mathbf{x}'|^3}d^3x'$$
$$\Phi_W=\int{\rho(\mathbf{x}',t)\rho(\mathbf{x}'',t)(x-x')_i\over|\mathbf{x}-\mathbf{x}'|^3}\left({(x'-x'')^i\over|\mathbf{x}-\mathbf{x}'|}-{(x-x'')^i\over|\mathbf{x}'-\mathbf{x}''|}\right)d^3x'd^3x''$$
$$A=\int{\rho(\mathbf{x}',t)\left(\mathbf{v}(\mathbf{x}',t)\cdot(\mathbf{x}-\mathbf{x}')\right)^2\over|\mathbf{x}-\mathbf{x}'|^3}d^3x'$$
$$\Phi_1=\int{\rho(\mathbf{x}',t)\mathbf{v}(\mathbf{x}',t)^2\over|\mathbf{x}-\mathbf{x}'|}d^3x'$$
$$\Phi_2=\int{\rho(\mathbf{x}',t)U(\mathbf{x}',t)\over|\mathbf{x}-\mathbf{x}'|}d^3x'$$
$$\Phi_3=\int{\rho(\mathbf{x}',t)\Pi(\mathbf{x}',t)\over|\mathbf{x}-\mathbf{x}'|}d^3x'$$
$$\Phi_4=\int{p(\mathbf{x}',t)\over|\mathbf{x}-\mathbf{x}'|}d^3x'$$
$$V_i=\int{\rho(\mathbf{x}',t)v(\mathbf{x}',t)_i\over|\mathbf{x}-\mathbf{x}'|}d^3x'$$
$$W_i=\int{\rho(\mathbf{x}',t)\left(\mathbf{v}(\mathbf{x}',t)\cdot(\mathbf{x}-\mathbf{x}')\right)(x-x')_i\over|\mathbf{x}-\mathbf{x}'|^3}d^3x'$$

where $\rho$ is the density of rest mass, $\Pi$ is the internal energy per unit rest mass, $p$ is the pressure as measured in a local freely falling frame momentarily comoving with the matter, and $\mathbf{v}$ is the coordinate velocity of the matter.

Stress-energy tensor for a perfect fluid takes form

$$T^{00}=\rho(1+\Pi+\mathbf{v}^2+2U)$$
$$T^{0i}=\rho(1+\Pi+\mathbf{v}^2+2U+p/\rho)v^i$$
$$T^{ij}=\rho(1+\Pi+\mathbf{v}^2+2U+p/\rho)v^iv^j+p\delta^{ij}(1-2\gamma U)$$

== How to apply PPN ==
Examples of the process of applying PPN formalism to alternative theories of gravity can be found in Will (1981, 1993). It is a nine step process:

- Step 1: Identify the variables, which may include: (a) dynamical gravitational variables such as the metric $g_{\mu\nu}$, scalar field $\phi$, vector field $K_\mu$, tensor field $B_{\mu\nu}$ and so on; (b) prior-geometrical variables such as a flat background metric $\eta_{\mu\nu}$, cosmic time function $t$, and so on; (c) matter and non-gravitational field variables.
- Step 2: Set the cosmological boundary conditions. Assume a homogeneous isotropic cosmology, with isotropic coordinates in the rest frame of the universe. A complete cosmological solution may or may not be needed. Call the results $g^{(0)}_{\mu\nu} = \operatorname{diag}(-c_0,c_1,c_1,c_1)$, $\phi_0$, $K^{(0)}_\mu$, $B^{(0)}_{\mu\nu}$.
- Step 3: Get new variables from $h_{\mu\nu}=g_{\mu\nu}-g^{(0)}_{\mu\nu}$, with $\phi-\phi_0$, $K_\mu-K^{(0)}_\mu$ or $B_{\mu\nu}-B^{(0)}_{\mu\nu}$ if needed.
- Step 4: Substitute these forms into the field equations, keeping only such terms as are necessary to obtain a final consistent solution for $h_{\mu\nu}$. Substitute the perfect fluid stress tensor for the matter sources.
- Step 5: Solve for $h_{00}$ to $O(2)$. Assuming this tends to zero far from the system, one obtains the form $h_{00}=2\alpha U$ where $U$ is the Newtonian gravitational potential and $\alpha$ may be a complicated function including the gravitational "constant" $G$. The Newtonian metric has the form $g_{00}=-c_0+2\alpha U$, $g_{0j}=0$, $g_{ij}=\delta_{ij}c_1$. Work in units where the gravitational "constant" measured today far from gravitating matter is unity so set $G_{\mathrm{today}} = \alpha/c_0 c_1=1$.
- Step 6: From linearized versions of the field equations solve for $h_{ij}$ to $O(2)$ and $h_{0j}$ to $O(3)$.
- Step 7: Solve for $h_{00}$ to $O(4)$. This is the messiest step, involving all the nonlinearities in the field equations. The stress–energy tensor must also be expanded to sufficient order.
- Step 8: Convert to local quasi-Cartesian coordinates and to standard PPN gauge.
- Step 9: By comparing the result for $g_{\mu\nu}$ with the equations presented in PPN with alpha-zeta parameters, read off the PPN parameter values.

== Comparisons between theories of gravity ==
A table comparing PPN parameters for 23 theories of gravity can be found in Alternatives to general relativity#Parametric post-Newtonian parameters for a range of theories.

Most metric theories of gravity can be lumped into categories. Scalar theories of gravitation include conformally flat theories and stratified theories with time-orthogonal space slices.

In conformally flat theories such as Nordström's theory of gravitation the metric is given by $\mathbf{g}=f\boldsymbol{\eta}$ and for this metric $\gamma=-1$, which drastically disagrees with observations. In stratified theories such as Yilmaz theory of gravitation the metric is given by $\mathbf{g}=f_1\mathbf{d}t \otimes \mathbf{d} t +f_2\boldsymbol{\eta}$ and for this metric $\alpha_1=-4(\gamma+1)$, which also disagrees drastically with observations.

Another class of theories is the quasilinear theories such as Whitehead's theory of gravitation. For these $\xi=\beta$. The relative magnitudes of the harmonics of the Earth's tides depend on $\xi$ and $\alpha_2$, and measurements show that quasilinear theories disagree with observations of Earth's tides.

Another class of metric theories is the bimetric theory. For all of these $\alpha_2$ is non-zero. From the precession of the solar spin we know that $\alpha_2 < 4\times 10^{-7}$, and that effectively rules out bimetric theories.

Another class of metric theories is the scalar–tensor theories, such as Brans–Dicke theory. For all of these, $\gamma=\textstyle\frac{1+\omega}{2+\omega}$. The limit of $\gamma-1<2.3\times10^{-5}$ means that $\omega$ would have to be very large, so these theories are looking less and less likely as experimental accuracy improves.

The final main class of metric theories is the vector–tensor theories. For all of these the gravitational "constant" varies with time and $\alpha_2$ is non-zero. Lunar laser ranging experiments tightly constrain the variation of the gravitational "constant" with time and $\alpha_2 < 4\times 10^{-7}$, so these theories are also looking unlikely.

There are some metric theories of gravity that do not fit into the above categories, but they have similar problems.

== Accuracy from experimental tests ==
Bounds on the PPN parameters from Will (2006) and Will (2014)

Parameter	Bound	Effects	Experiment
$\gamma-1$	2.3×10^{−5}	Time delay, light deflection	Cassini tracking
$\beta-1$	8×10^{−5}	Perihelion shift	Perihelion shift
$\beta-1$	2.3×10^{−4}	Nordtvedt effect with assumption $\eta_N=4\beta-\gamma-3$	Nordtvedt effect
$\xi$	4×10^{−9}	Spin precession	Millisecond pulsars
$\alpha_1$	1×10^{−4}	Orbital polarization	Lunar laser ranging
$\alpha_1$	4×10^{−5}	Orbital polarization	PSR J1738+0333
$\alpha_2$	2×10^{−9}	Spin precession	Millisecond pulsars
$\alpha_3$	4×10^{−20}	Self-acceleration	Pulsar spin-down statistics
$\eta_N$	9×10^{−4}	Nordtvedt effect	Lunar laser ranging
$\zeta_1$	0.02	Combined PPN bounds	—
$\zeta_2$	4×10^{−5}^{†}	Binary-pulsar acceleration	PSR 1913+16
$\zeta_3$	1×10^{−8}	Newton's 3rd law	Lunar acceleration
$\zeta_4$	0.006^{‡}	—	Kreuzer experiment

^{†} Will, C. M. (10 July 1992). "Is momentum conserved? A test in the binary system PSR 1913 + 16". Astrophysical Journal Letters. 393 (2): L59–L61. Bibcode:1992ApJ...393L..59W. doi:10.1086/186451. ISSN 0004-637X.
^{‡} Based on $6\zeta_4 = 3\alpha_3 + 2\zeta_1 - 3\zeta_3$ from Will (1976, 2006). It is theoretically possible for an alternative model of gravity to bypass this bound, in which case the bound is $|\zeta_4| < 0.4$ from Ni (1972).

== See also ==
- Alternatives to general relativity#Parametric post-Newtonian parameters for a range of theories
- Effective one-body formalism
- Linearized gravity
- Peskin–Takeuchi parameter The same thing as PPN, but for electroweak theory instead of gravitation
- Tests of general relativity
