= Nordtvedt =

Nordtvedt is a Norwegian surname. Notable people with the surname include:

- Kenneth Nordtvedt (1939–2025), American physicist
- Tom Nordtvedt (born 1963), Norwegian Paralympic swimmer
- Tore Nordtvedt (born 1944), Norwegian football player

== See also ==
- Nordtvedt effect, an effect in theoretical astrophysics, named after Kenneth Nordtvedt
