= Lev Yilmaz =

American comic artist, film maker, and publisher

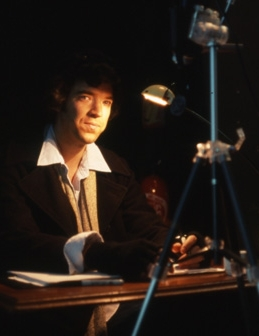
- Yilmaz with the camera rig for the live part of the show in Paris
- Born: Levni R. Yilmaz Boston, Massachusetts, United States
- Occupation: Comics artist, animator

Website
- ingredientx.com

Levni Yilmaz (born 1973) is an American independent film maker, artist and publisher, best known for his "Tales of Mere Existence" animated comic series. He is based in San Francisco.

== Early life ==
Yilmaz was born in Boston, Massachusetts to parents Karen Carlson and physicist Hüseyin Yılmaz (the author of the Yilmaz theory of gravitation). He is of Turkish and Swedish descent.

He attended art school in Boston before he moved to San Francisco in 1998.

== Tales of Mere Existence ==
The "Tales of Mere Existence" series began in 2002 as a series of animated comics that were shown at film festivals.

Each video in the "Tales of Mere Existence" series shows a series of static cartoons, which appear gradually as if being drawn by an invisible hand. Yilmaz' technique is inspired by the French documentary The Mystery of Picasso (1956), which similarly shows Picasso's paintings appearing from the other side.

Yilmaz writes, draws, films, edits, and narrates all of the "Tales of Mere Existence" videos. He often recounts personal anecdotes and observations and discusses his views on interpersonal relationships, society and human behavior. His videos are told from a rather pessimistic viewpoint and tend to have a sarcastic undertone.

In 2003, Yilmaz began to sell DVDs that contained some of his short comic films. Along with the DVD came the first print version of the "Tales of Mere Existence" book. Over the next six years, Yilmaz published three more books, as his fan base grew to thousands. His first official book, Sunny Side Down, was published by Simon & Schuster in 2009.

== Popularity ==
In recent years Yilmaz gained a large fan base with millions of followers around his animated comics on YouTube. He uses this online popularity to promote his books and DVDs, which are sold from his personal website.

Yilmaz has made appearances in New York for events such as Rooftop Film Festival, performing live readings from his books.

In October 2010, his comic God was featured on Franco-German TV Network arte. In December 2010, A Few of My High School Teachers aired on Showtime.

== Publications ==
Tales of Mere Existence

1. Tales of Mere Existence I (2003)
2. Tales of Mere Existence II (2004)
3. The 7 Habits of Highly Negative People (2006)
4. Sunny Side Down (2009)
5. The Doom Room (2013)
