= David L. Lee =

Taiwanese business executive and venture capitalist

- Born: 1949 (age 76–77); Taipei, Taiwan
- Education: McGill University (BS); California Institute of Technology (PhD)
- Known for: Co-founding Global Crossing
- Title: Chairman of J. Paul Getty Trust (2019–2023)

Chinese name
- Chinese: 李立
Transcriptions
Standard Mandarin
- Hanyu Pinyin: Lǐ Lì

David Li Lee (Chinese: 李立; born 1949) is a Taiwanese theoretical physicist, business executive and venture capitalist. He is best known for co-founding Global Crossing Ltd.

== Early life and education ==
Lee was born and raised in Taipei, Taiwan. He moved to Canada to attend college and graduated from McGill University with a bachelor's degree in physics with honors in three years. He then earned his Ph.D. in theoretical physics with a minor in economics from the California Institute of Technology in 1974 with Kip S. Thorne as his advisor. His thesis work was on alternative theories of gravity to Einstein's General Theory of Relativity; he is co-author of the Lightman-Lee and Lee-Lightman-Ni theories of gravity.

== Career ==
Lee, also a certified public accountant, started his business career at Arthur Andersen & Co. in Los Angeles in 1975. In 1981, he joined a company that was acquired by the satellite communications firm Comsat, where he held a variety of executive positions before joining TRW Information Systems Group in 1986. At TRW, he was group vice president of finance and acquisitions.

Lee left TRW in late 1989 to join Pacific Capital Group, where he facilitated the firm's expansion into the telecommunications industry. He co-founded the transcontinental telecommunications firm Global Crossing in 1997 and served as its president and chief operating officer until early 2000, when he left to launch Clarity Partners with Barry Porter, Steve Rader and R. Rudolph Reinfrank.

In 1999 Lee donated $10 million to Caltech to fund a virtual center in advanced networking, also making a similar donation to Chiao-Tung University, in Taiwan, to fund a sister program. He is chairman of the Board of Overseers of the University of Southern California medical school, a trustee of the J. Paul Getty Trust, and chair of the Board of Trustees of the California Institute of Technology.
