= Extended theories of gravity =

Extended theories of gravity are alternative theories of gravity developed from the starting points investigated first by Albert Einstein and Hilbert. These are theories describing gravity, which are metric theory, "a linear connection" or related affine theories, or metric-affine gravitation theory. Rather than trying to discover correct calculations for the matter side of the Einstein field equations (which include inflation, dark energy, dark matter, large-scale structure, and possibly quantum gravity), it is instead proposed to change the gravitational side of the equation.

Core concepts of RAQUAL such as a weak field limit that follows $f(\chi)\approx\chi^\frac{3}{2}$ have been adopted under the name "extended gravity", by Hernández and Mendoza at the National Autonomous University of Mexico. This theory is an f(R) gravity theory, more properly an f(R,T) theory, derived from an action principle. This approach to solve the dark matter problem takes into account the Tully–Fisher relation and MOND. This matches gravitational lensing observations without the need for dark matter. There is some evidence that it could also explain the dark energy phenomena and give a solution to the initial conditions problem.

== News ==
- El universal.com (in Spanish).
- La jornada.mx (in Spanish).
- La crónica.com (in Spanish).
