= Whitehead's theory of gravitation =

1922 theory, now obsolete

In theoretical physics, Whitehead's theory of gravitation was introduced by the mathematician and philosopher Alfred North Whitehead in 1922. While never broadly accepted, at one time it was a scientifically plausible alternative to general relativity. However, after further experimental and theoretical consideration, the theory is now generally regarded as obsolete.

== Principal features ==
Whitehead developed his theory of gravitation by considering how the world line of a particle is affected by those of nearby particles. He arrived at an expression for what he called the "potential impetus" of one particle due to another, which modified Newton's law of universal gravitation by including a time delay for the propagation of gravitational influences. Whitehead's formula for the potential impetus involves the Minkowski metric, which is used to determine which events are causally related and to calculate how gravitational influences are delayed by distance. The potential impetus calculated by means of the Minkowski metric is then used to compute a physical spacetime metric $g_{\mu\nu}$, and the motion of a test particle is given by a geodesic with respect to the metric $g_{\mu\nu}$. Unlike the Einstein field equations, Whitehead's theory is linear, in that the superposition of two solutions is again a solution. This implies that Einstein's and Whitehead's theories will generally make different predictions when more than two massive bodies are involved.

Following the notation of Chiang and Hamity , introduce a Minkowski spacetime with metric tensor $\eta_{ab}=\mathrm{diag}(1, -1, -1, -1)$, where the indices $a, b$ run from 0 through 3, and let the masses of a set of gravitating particles be $m_a$.

The Minkowski arc length of particle $A$ is denoted by $\tau_A$. Consider an event $p$ with co-ordinates $\chi^a$. A retarded event $p_A$ with co-ordinates $\chi_A^a$ on the world-line of particle $A$ is defined by the relations $(y_A^a = \chi^a - \chi_A^a, y_A^a y_{Aa} = 0, y_A^0 > 0)$. The unit tangent vector at $p_A$ is $\lambda_A^a = (dx_A^a/d\tau_A)p_A$. We also need the invariants $w_A = y_A^a \lambda_{Aa}$. Then, a gravitational tensor potential is defined by

$$g_{ab} = \eta_{ab} - h_{ab},$$

where

$$h_{ab} = 2\sum_A \frac{m_A}{w_A^3} y_{Aa} y_{Ab}.$$

It is the metric $g$ that appears in the geodesic equation.

== Experimental tests ==
Whitehead's theory is equivalent with the Schwarzschild metric and makes the same predictions as general relativity regarding the four classical solar system tests (gravitational red shift, though 7/6 the Einstein value, light bending, perihelion shift, Shapiro time delay), and was regarded as a viable competitor of general relativity for several decades. In 1971, Will argued that Whitehead's theory predicts a periodic variation in local gravitational acceleration 200 times longer than the bound established by experiment. Misner, Thorne and Wheeler's textbook Gravitation states that Will demonstrated "Whitehead's theory predicts a time-dependence for the ebb and flow of ocean tides that is completely contradicted by everyday experience".

Fowler argued that different tidal predictions can be obtained by a more realistic model of the galaxy. Reinhardt and Rosenblum claimed that the disproof of Whitehead's theory by tidal effects was "unsubstantiated". Chiang and Hamity argued that Reinhardt and Rosenblum's approach "does not provide a unique space-time geometry for a general gravitation system", and they confirmed Will's calculations by a different method. In 1989, a modification of Whitehead's theory was proposed that eliminated the unobserved sidereal tide effects. However, the modified theory did not allow the existence of black holes.

== Philosophical disputes ==
Clifford M. Will argued that Whitehead's theory features a prior geometry. Under Will's presentation (which was inspired by John Lighton Synge's interpretation of the theory), Whitehead's theory has the curious feature that electromagnetic waves propagate along null geodesics of the physical spacetime (as defined by the metric determined from geometrical measurements and timing experiments), while gravitational waves propagate along null geodesics of a flat background represented by the metric tensor of Minkowski spacetime. The gravitational potential can be expressed entirely in terms of waves retarded along the background metric, like the Liénard–Wiechert potential in electromagnetic theory.

A cosmological constant can be introduced by changing the background metric to a de Sitter or anti-de Sitter metric. This was first suggested by G. Temple in 1923. Temple's suggestions on how to do this were criticized by C. B. Rayner in 1955.

Will's work was disputed by Dean R. Fowler, who argued that Will's presentation of Whitehead's theory contradicts Whitehead's philosophy of nature. For Whitehead, the geometric structure of nature grows out of the relations among what he termed "actual occasions". Fowler claimed that a philosophically consistent interpretation of Whitehead's theory makes it an alternate, mathematically equivalent, presentation of general relativity. In turn, Jonathan Bain argued that Fowler's criticism of Will was in error.

== See also ==
- Classical theories of gravitation
- Eddington–Finkelstein coordinates
