= Ni Wei-tou =

Taiwanese physicist

Ni Wei-tou (Chinese: 倪維斗; pinyin: Ní Wéidòu; born 1944 in Zhenhai, Ningbo, Zhejiang) is a Taiwanese physicist, who graduated from the Department of Physics of National Taiwan University (NTU), and got his PhD in physics and mathematics from the California Institute of Technology. After his retirement on 1 October 2000, he is now appointed as a professor emeritus of the Department of Physics of National Tsing Hua University (NTHU) at Hsinchu, Taiwan, since 2006.

He is an expert of theoretical and experimental gravitational physics, astrophysics, cosmology, particle physics, and quantum optics etc. He is famous for his alternative theories of gravitation to general relativity, such as Ni (1972), Ni (1973), and Lee, Lightman & Ni (1974). He has been devoted to popular science in Taiwan.

== Books ==
- 2017 One Hundred Years of General Relativity: From Genesis and Empirical Foundations to Gravitational Waves, Cosmology and Quantum Gravity (The 2 Volumes)
