= Kenneth Nordtvedt =

American physicist (1939–2025)

- Born: April 16, 1939; Chicago, Illinois, U.S.
- Died: October 9, 2025 (aged 86); Bozeman, Montana, U.S.
- Education: MIT; Stanford University (PhD)
- Known for: Nordtvedt effect PPN formalism
- Scientific career
- Fields: Physics; Gravity
- Thesis: Application of the Linearized Equation of Motion Method to the Electron-phonon System (1965)

Kenneth Leon Nordtvedt Jr. (April 16, 1939 – October 9, 2025) was an American physicist. He specialized in research for space agencies, including NASA, and promoted the use of Lunar Laser Ranging experiments to test theories of gravity. The Nordtvedt effect, a hypothetical gravitational effect, is named after him.

== Life ==
Nordtvedt graduated from the Massachusetts Institute of Technology (MIT) in 1960 and obtained a PhD from Stanford University in 1964. He was a junior fellow in the Harvard Society of Fellows from 1963 to 1965. Soon after witnessing the Sputnik spacecraft cross the Boston sky in fall of 1957, he became a part-time student employee for the Mars Probe project at the MIT Instrumentation Lab, and in early 1960s was staff physicist at the same laboratory's project to develop the Apollo program's navigation and guidance system.

He was a board member and scientific advisor overseeing the joint NASA-ESA Space Test of Equivalence Principle mission. In 1986 he was appointed by then President Ronald Reagan to the National Science Board. He had support from NASA and the National Science Foundation for much of his research, as well as being a Sloan Fellow. His research was the subject of a Wall Street Journal article featured on the front page.

Nordtvedt was elected to three terms in the Montana state legislature for a six-year period from 1979 to 1984, and there he wrote one of the first inflation indexing reforms of income tax law in the nation. He served briefly in 1989 as Director of the Montana Department of Revenue.

He died on October 9, 2025.

== Works ==
=== Gravitation ===
In 1968 Nordtvedt calculated how and to what degree the gravitational-to-inertial mass ratio of gravitationally compact bodies—bodies with significant gravitational binding energy—will generally differ from one in gravity theories other than general relativity, and he then showed how lunar laser ranging data could be used to measure that key ratio to significant precision for the Earth. This phenomenon is now called the Nordtvedt effect. This effect would violate the equivalence principle, and no evidence of this effect has been found. This effect is of special interest in alternative scalar–tensor theories of gravity, like Brans–Dicke theory.

He showed in 1988 that general relativity's gravitomagnetism between Earth and Moon, as those bodies orbit the Sun, was essential to fitting the synodic month and half synodic month range signals from lunar laser ranging.

=== Genetic genealogy ===
Nordtvedt performed research into genetic haplogroups, particularly the Y-chromosome DNA group I, to which he belonged.

== Selected works ==
- Nordtvedt, Kenneth (May 25, 1968). "Equivalence Principle for Massive Bodies. I. Phenomenology". Physical Review. 169 (5): 1014–1016. doi:10.1103/physrev.169.1014. ISSN 0031-899X. Archived from the original on May 30, 2025.
- Nordtvedt, K. (June 25, 1968). "Testing Relativity with Laser Ranging to the Moon". Physical Review. 170 (5): 1186–1187. doi:10.1103/physrev.170.1186. ISSN 0031-899X. Archived from the original on May 30, 2025.
- 1960 "Interplanetary Navigation System Study" MIT Instrumentation Laboratory Report R-273
- 1964 "Preliminary Study of a Backup Manual Navigation Scheme" MIT Instrumentation Laboratory E-1540

== See also ==
- Alternatives to general relativity
- Parameterized post-Newtonian formalism
- Scalar–tensor theory
