= Yilmaz theory of gravitation =

Theory of gravity

The Yilmaz theory of gravitation is an attempt by Huseyin Yilmaz (1924–2013; Turkish: Hüseyin Yılmaz) and his coworkers to formulate a classical field theory of gravitation which is similar to general relativity in weak-field conditions, but in which event horizons cannot appear.

Yilmaz's work has been criticized on the grounds that:

- his proposed field equation is ill-defined
- event horizons can occur in weak field situations according to the general theory of relativity, in the case of a supermassive black hole
- the theory is consistent only with either a completely empty universe or a negative energy vacuum

It is well known that attempts to quantize general relativity along the same lines which lead from Maxwell's classical field theory of electromagnetism to quantum electrodynamics fail, and that it has proven very difficult to construct a theory of quantum gravity which goes over to general relativity in an appropriate limit. However Yilmaz has claimed that his theory is "compatible with quantum mechanics". He suggests that it might be an alternative to superstring theory.

In his theory, Yilmaz wishes to retain the left hand side of the Einstein field equation (namely the Einstein tensor, which is well-defined for any Lorentzian manifold, independent of general relativity) but to modify the right hand side, the stress–energy tensor, by adding a kind of gravitational contribution, namely the scalar field. According to Yilmaz's critics, this additional term is not well-defined, and cannot be made well defined due to issues with covariance.

No astronomers have tested his ideas, although some have tested competitors of general relativity; see Category:Tests of general relativity.
