= Nordtvedt effect =

Effect in theoretical astrophysics

In theoretical astrophysics, the Nordtvedt effect, sometimes called the Dicke–Nordtvedt effect, refers to a hypothetical effect that predicts a relative motion between the Earth and the Moon that would be observed if the gravitational self-energy of a body contributed differently to its gravitational mass than to its inertial mass. If observed, the Nordtvedt effect would violate the strong equivalence principle, which indicates that an object's movement in a gravitational field does not depend on its mass or composition. No evidence of the effect has been found.

The effect is named after Kenneth L. Nordtvedt, who suggested in 1968 that some theories of gravity imply that massive bodies should fall at different rates, depending upon their gravitational self-energy. Robert H. Dicke expanded on the topic in 1970.

Nordtvedt then observed that if gravity did in fact violate the strong equivalence principle, then the more-massive Earth should fall towards the Sun at a slightly different rate than the Moon, resulting in a polarization of the lunar orbit. To test for the existence (or absence) of the Nordtvedt effect, scientists have used the Lunar Laser Ranging experiment, which is capable of measuring the distance between the Earth and the Moon with near-millimetre accuracy. Thus far, the results have failed to find any evidence of the Nordtvedt effect, demonstrating that if it exists, the effect is exceedingly weak. Subsequent measurements and analysis to even higher precision have improved constraints on the effect. Measurements of Mercury's orbit by the MESSENGER spacecraft have further refined the Nordvedt effect to be below an even smaller scale.

A wide range of scalar–tensor theories have been found to naturally lead to a tiny effect only, at present epoch. This is due to a generic attractive mechanism that takes place during the cosmic evolution of the universe. Other screening mechanisms (chameleon, pressuron, Vainshtein etc.) could also be at play.

== See also ==
- Galileo's Leaning Tower of Pisa experiment
