= Yannis K. Semertzidis =

Greek physicist

- Ιωάννης Σεμερτζίδης
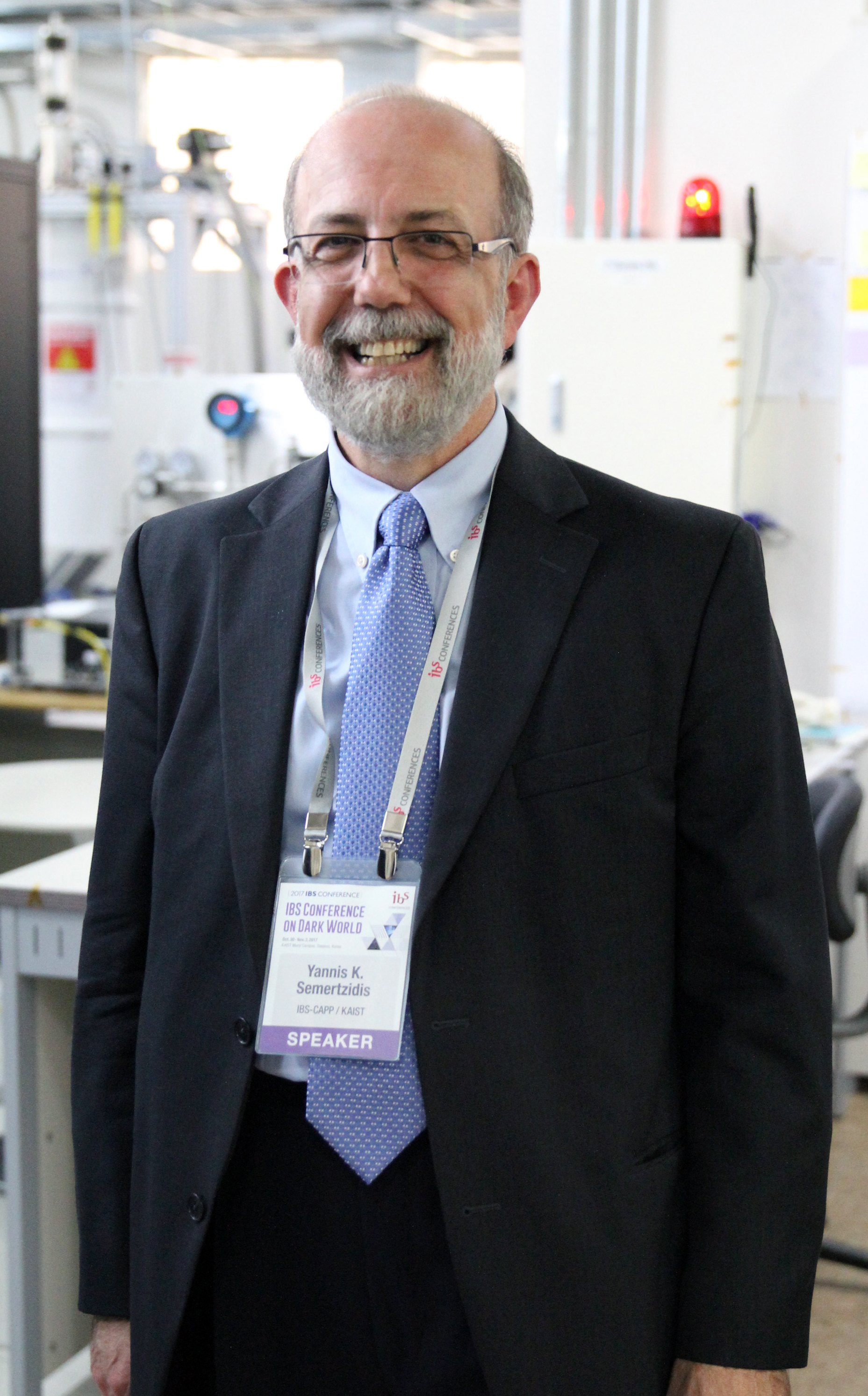
- Born: September 16, 1961 (age 65); Katerini, Greece
- Education: University of Rochester, Aristotle University of Thessaloniki
- Awards: Brookhaven National Laboratory Science and Technology Award
- Scientific career
- Fields: Dark matter, cold dark matter, axions, magnetic dipole moment, electric dipole moment, particle physics, nuclear physics
- Workplaces: Institute for Basic Science, KAIST, Brookhaven National Laboratory, University of Rochester
- Thesis: Coherent production of light pseudoscalars (axions) inside a magnetic field with a polarized laser beam (1989)
- Doctoral advisor: Adrian C. Melissinos
- Other academic advisors: Konstantin Zioutas
- Website: IBS Center for Axion and Precision Physics Research

Yannis K. Semertzidis is a physicist exploring axions as a dark matter candidate, precision physics in storage rings including muon g-2 and proton electric dipole moment (pEDM). The axion and the pEDM are intimately connected through the strong CP problem. Furthermore, if the pEDM is found to be non-zero, it can help resolve the matter anti-matter asymmetry mystery of our universe. During his research career, he held a number of positions in the Department of Physics in Brookhaven National Laboratory, including initiator and co-spokesperson of the Storage Ring Electric Dipole Moment Collaboration. He is the founding director of the Institute for Basic Science (IBS) Center for Axion and Precision Physics, is a professor in the Physics Department of KAIST, and a Fellow of the American Physical Society.

== Education ==
Semertzidis received a Bachelor of Science in physics from the Aristotle University of Thessaloniki, Greece in 1984. He then moved to New York and studied at the University of Rochester, obtaining Master of Science and Ph.D in physics in 1987 and 1989, respectively.

== Career ==
From 1990 until 1992, he worked as a research associate in the University of Rochester. Staying in New York, he next worked as an assistant physicist in the Department of Physics in Brookhaven National Laboratory (BNL) from 1992. The next year he took a leave of absence to work as a Fellow in the PPE Division at CERN from 1993 to 1995. He returned to BNL and worked as a physicist in 1997, became a tenured physicist in March 2000, and finally a tenured senior scientist in September 2012. While at BNL he primarily focused on two experimental projects: a number of precision physics experiments related to axions as a candidate for dark matter, and precision physics in storage rings, which included muons, and looking for the electric dipole moment of protons with increased sensitivity. If the electric dipole moment of protons is non-zero, it would violate the discrete symmetries of T-time and P-parity reversal symmetries in quantum mechanics. These symmetries are connected to the matter-antimatter asymmetry problem and observing the proton electric dipole moment could help solve that mystery. While working at BNL, Semertzidis also mentored a number of students with multiple of them going on to win awards. From summer 2015, his Center hosts an annual summer science program (KUSP) aimed at young physics students.

In October 2013, Semertzidis became the director of the Institute for Basic Science Center for Axion and Precision Physics and a physics professor at KAIST, where the Center is located. The dark matter research is focusing on the axion; a hypothetical elementary particle as a result of the Peccei–Quinn theory in 1977 to resolve the strong CP problem in quantum chromodynamics. As the mass of the axion is unknown, they are searching in the mass range of 0.001 meV to 1 meV by converting axions into microwave photons inside a large volume, with a high magnetic field, and inside a microwave cavity; a technique invented by Pierre Sikivie. If it is within this range, it is possible it will be discovered within the next ten years. Utilizing techniques created for the muon g-2 experiment and elsewhere, they are working towards improving the accuracy of electric dipole moment experiments to better than 10^{−29}e-cm.

In 2023, the Center for Axion and Precision Physics utilized a 12T magnet to search for axions in the Dine–Fischler–Srednicki–Zhitnitsky sensitivity, becoming only the second group in the world to do so. The first group is the Axion Dark Matter eXperiment (ADMX) which uses a 8T magnet.

== Honors and awards ==
- 2005: Fellow of the American Physical Society
- 2003: Brookhaven National Laboratory Science and Technology Award
