= Concord Consortium =

Educational research and development organization

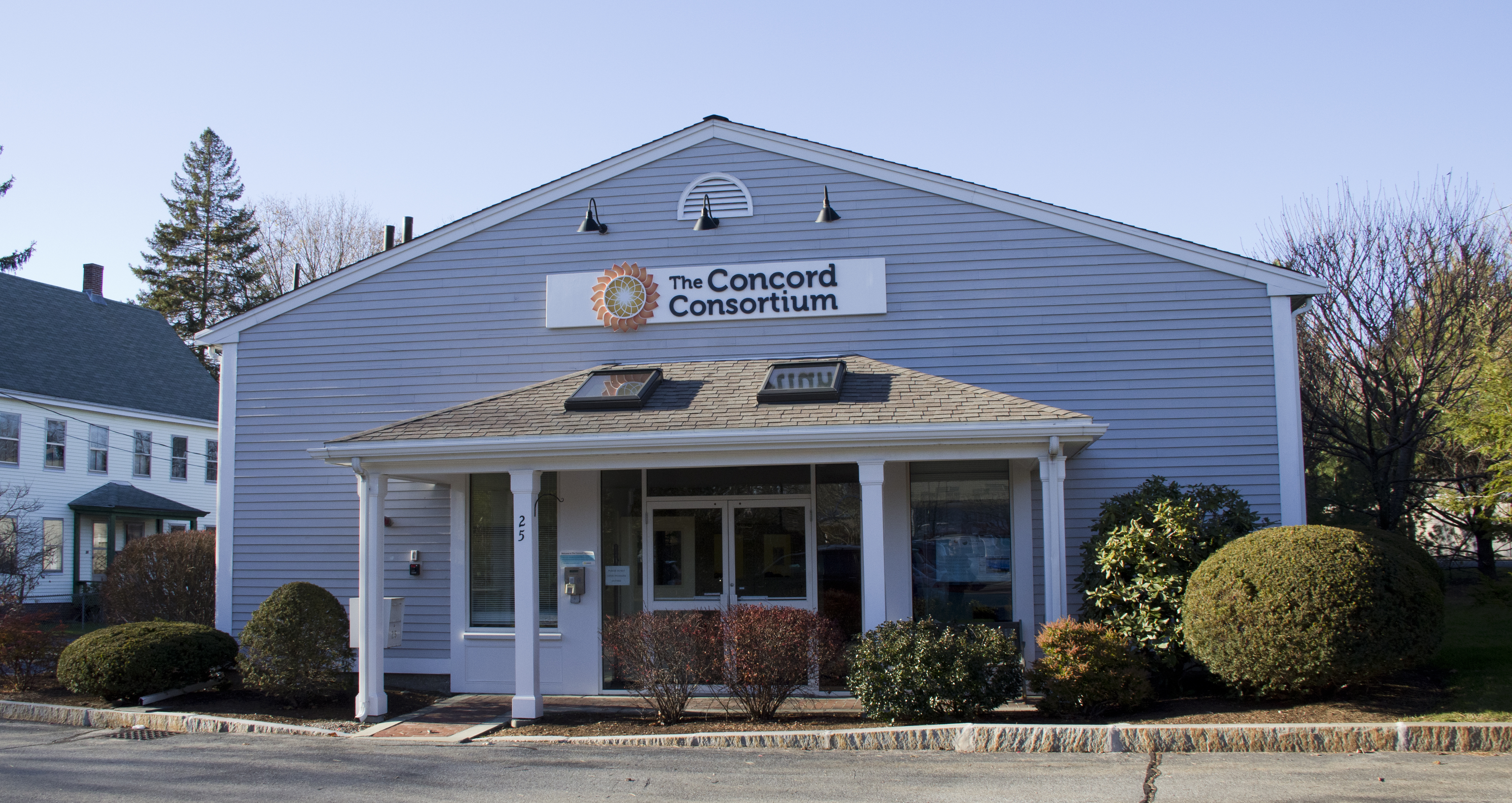
- Headquarters in Concord
- Type: 501(c)(3) nonprofit
- Industry: Research; Research and Development
- Founded: Concord, Massachusetts (1994)
- Founder: Robert F. Tinker
- Headquarters: 25 Love Lane; Concord, Massachusetts, United States
- Area served: United States
- Key people: Chad Dorsey (President & CEO) Lauren Walters (Chair, Board of Directors)
- Products: Educational technology
- Services: Research; Research and development
- Number of employees: 30 (in 2015)
- Website: concord.org

The Concord Consortium was founded in 1994 as an educational research and development organization to create large-scale improvements in K-14 teaching and learning through technology.

The company conducts research on improving science, math and engineering education with the use of technology. It developed the Vernier Software & Technology probeware for classrooms and mobile computers, created modeling software for genetics and molecular education, and developed a Web-based high school.

Located in Concord, Massachusetts, and Emeryville, California, the Concord Consortium employs 30 software engineers, scientists, education developers and other staff. President and CEO Chad Dorsey has led the organization since 2008, following the longtime tenure of founder Robert F. Tinker. The Concord Consortium is overseen by a 10-member Board of Directors that includes educators and business people. The organization works in partnership with universities, museums and other educational organizations, including Tufts University, New York Hall of Science, University of Illinois at Chicago, McGraw-Hill Education and National Geographic Society. The Concord Consortium is supported primarily by grants from the National Science Foundation (NSF), the U.S. Department of Education (DOE), the Noyce Foundation and Google.org.

== The early years ==
The Concord Consortium's first projects, funded by the National Science Foundation beginning in 1994, focused on guided student inquiry and the use of emerging technologies. A project-based approach to learning physics using inexpensive materials for hands-on investigations (Hands on Physics) was based on the work of MIT professor John G. King. The Concord Consortium also pioneered the use of portable computers and sensors for student explorations outside the classroom (Science Learning in Context) with science education researchers Joe Krajcik and Elliot Soloway. The International Netcourse Teacher Enhancement Coalition (INTEC) used online facilitated discussion to provide online teacher professional development to secondary math and science teachers. These projects became the platform from which the Concord Consortium created educational initiatives as a way to use digital technology to enhance classroom engagement and create new science, math and engineering curricula.

== Educational technology and research ==
The Concord Consortium's major areas of research and development are modeling and simulations, probeware, mobile computing, online learning, and assessment. The organization has created educational technology research initiatives with hundreds of biology, chemistry, Earth and space science, engineering, mathematics and physics activities and materials for grade levels elementary to higher education.

=== Modeling and simulations ===
The company's research on models and simulations in education has focused on molecular literacy and making complex topics understandable and accessible at earlier grades. The organization has developed interactive computational models that manipulate unobservable events, such as atoms and molecules, chemical reactions, gene and DNA manipulation and evolution, and manipulate virtual environments in order to understand complex topics such as climate change. Molecular Workbench software, which won Science Magazine's 2011 SPORE Prize, provides hundreds of interactive simulations for teaching and learning physics, chemistry, biology and nanotechnology.

Concord Consortium modeling software also supports topics such as evolution, Earth and space science, energy efficiency, heredity, and other topics for which computer simulations connect the real and virtual worlds. Many of these science and mathematics curriculum materials are available on the website for free through open content licenses.

=== Probeware and mobile computing ===
Using digital scientific probes and sensors that collect real-time temperature, motion, gas pressure, light and other data and display it for analysis on laptops and hand-held devices has been a focus of the Concord Consortium since its founding. Robert Tinker used such probeware in the 1980s when he designed a microcomputer-based real-time temperature data grapher for education. Concord Consortium research has shown the effectiveness of sensors and handhelds in elementary and middle school inquiry-based science units.

=== Online learning ===
The company's Virtual High School (VHS) offered Web-based courses to secondary school students on a subscription basis through a worldwide network of public and private schools. VHS was originally funded by a U.S. Department of Education Technology Innovation Challenge Grant in 1997. In 2001, it became an independent nonprofit and in 2012 became the VHS Collaborative. In 2001, VHS received the Stockholm Challenge Award for exemplary use of technology in education. In 2005, it received U.S. Distance Learning Association (USDLA) Awards for Excellence in Programming and Excellence in Best Practices.

In collaboration with PBS Teacherline and Teachscape, the Concord Consortium began offering Seeing Math online teacher professional development courses for elementary and secondary mathematics teachers in 2005. The Concord Consortium subsequently developed courses for secondary science teachers and for Physics First schools in Rhode Island.

The Concord e-Learning Model for online teaching and learning describes best practices for high-quality online courses. It is one of the models for best practices in online course delivery.

=== Assessment ===
The company develops technology-based assessment that records student responses in real time and embeds formative assessment within a lesson. Embedded software can track student performance and create automated assessments. A collaborative project with the University of California, Berkeley and the University of Toronto explores student cumulative learning about energy concepts using embedded assessment and dynamic diagramming technology. A project with the Center for Occupational Research and Development (CORD), Tidewater Community College, and ETS is assessing students’ collaborative-problem skills based on fine-grained logs of student actions using simulations of electronic circuits. The Concord Consortium has also developed models and simulations that allow students to answer questions with an annotated image or by conducting a virtual experiment.
