= Kim Jihn-eui =

South Korean physicist (born 1946)

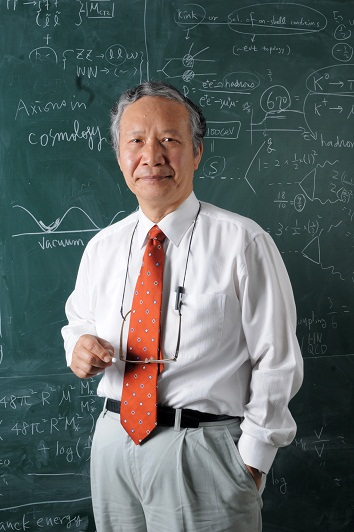
- Born: 30 July 1946 (age 80); Gurye, South Jeolla, southern Korea
- Education: Kyunggi High School; Seoul National University; University of Rochester
- Known for: KSVZ model Strong CP Invariance; Cosmological Gravitino
- Awards: Korea Science Award (1987); Ho-Am Prize (1992); Humboldt Prize (2001); Top Scientist and Technologist Award of Korea (2003)
- Scientific career
- Fields: Physics
- Workplaces: Seoul National University

Korean name
- Hangul: 김진의
- Hanja: 金鎭義
- RR: Gim Jinui
- MR: Kim Chinŭi

Kim Jihn-eui (Korean: 김진의; born July 30, 1946) is a South Korean theoretical physicist. His research interests concentrate on particle physics and cosmology and has many contributions to the field, most notably the suggestion of the invisible axion.

== Birth and education ==
Kim was born in Gurye, South Jeolla Province in 1946. He graduated from Kyunggi High School and earned his bachelor's degree in chemical engineering from Seoul National University in 1971. He earned his Ph.D. in particle physics from University of Rochester in 1975. He became a research associate at Brown University from 1975 to 1977 and worked as a research investigator at University of Pennsylvania to 1980. Then he was appointed to assistant professor of Seoul National University in 1980 and had been there until retirement in 2011. Afterwards he took a position at Gwangju Institute of Science and Technology in Gwangju. Currently he is distinguished professor and eminent scholar at Kyung Hee University.

He was also a professor in School of Physics at Korea Institute for Advanced Study from 1998 to 1999 and held many inviting positions from other institutions including CERN, University of Michigan, Harvard University and University of Bonn.

== Research ==
Kim's research is focused on the elementary particle theory and particle cosmology. He suggested the invisible axion model known as the KSVZ (Kim–Shifman–Vainshtein–Zakharov) model, which provides a solution to the strong CP problem in the Standard Model. He also advocated that the axino, the supersymmetric dual of axion, can be a strong candidate of dark matter of our universe and contended that it might have played an important role in the formation of galaxies and may offer a significant part of the current energy density of the universe. His review about the neutral current gave a good understanding of the Glashow–Salam–Weinberg model to the field. With H. P. Nilles, he formulated and presented the solution of the μ problem in supergravity, then he led the calculation of the cosmological effect of the gravitino. From the collapse effect of the supergraviton which interacts much weaker than a light axion or axino, Kim obtained the upper limit of the reheating temperature of the universe 10^{9}GeV and that made an early contribution of the field of cosmological research about heavy and weak interacting particles. He also did the first attempt to get the Standard Model from the superstring theory. He contributed to the development of standard model from the higher-dimensional theories by reducing the dimensions of orbifold and was absorbed in the cosmological constant problem and gave a clue of the solution of it in 5d spacetime.

== Honors and awards ==
- 1987: Korea Science Award
- 1992: Ho-Am Prize
- 2001: Humboldt Prize
- 2003: Top Scientist and Technologist Award of Korea

== Bibliography ==
- Kang-Sin Choi; Jihn E. Kim (2009). Quarks and Leptons From Orbifolded Superstring. Springer. ISBN 978-3-540-32763-9.
- Kim Jihn Eui (1984). 소립자와 게이지 상호작용 [Elementary Particles and Gauge Interactions]. Daewoo Academic Series : Natural Science 001 (in Korean). Minumsa. ISBN 89-374-3500-4. Archived from the original on 2011-07-22.

== See also ==
- KSVZ axion
- Axino
