= Michael Barnett =

Michael or Mike Barnett may refer to:

- Michael N. Barnett (born 1960), constructivist scholar of international relations
- Michael P. Barnett (1929–2012), British chemist and computer scientist
- R. Michael Barnett, physicist
- Michael Barnett (soccer), Australian football (soccer) player
- Big Mike (rapper) (born 1971), American rapper Michael Barnett
- Mike Barnett (athlete) (born 1961), American athlete
- Mike Barnett (baseball) (born 1959), American League baseball hitting coach
- Mike Barnett (ice hockey) (born 1948), former general manager in the NHL for the Phoenix Coyotes
- Mike Barnett (politician) (1946–2023), Australian politician
- Mike Barnett, musician on the Adrian Belew album Young Lions
