= MCG-02-12-039 =

Galaxy in the constellation of Type-cD in Eridanus

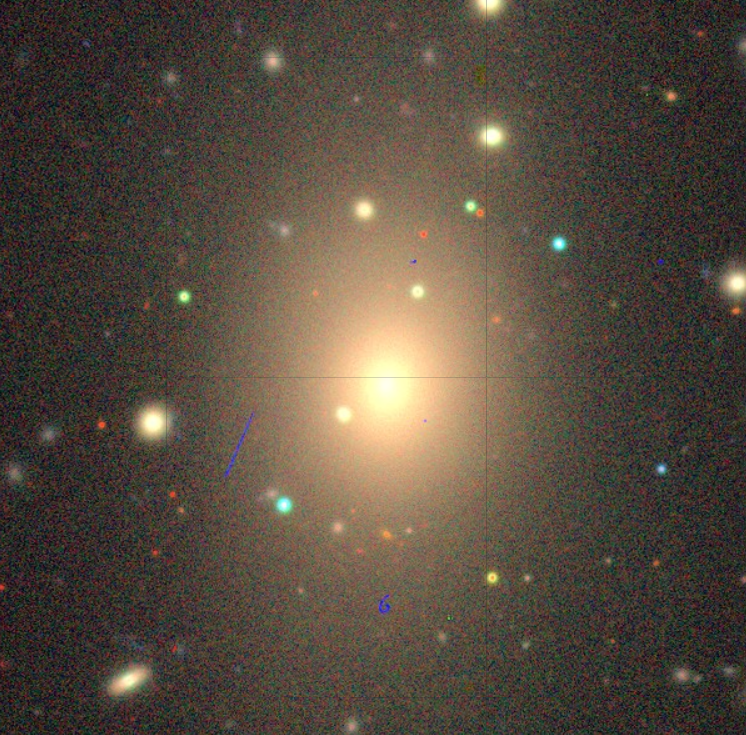
- The galaxy MCG-02-12-039

Observation data (J2000 epoch)
- Constellation: Eridanus
- Right ascension: 04^{h} 33^{m} 37.83^{s}
- Declination: −13° 15′ 42.95″
- Redshift: 0.032806
- Heliocentric radial velocity: 9835 km/s ± 11
- Distance: 468.2 ± 32.8 Mly (143.55 ± 10.05 Mpc)
- Group or cluster: Abell 496
- Apparent magnitude (B): 14.66

Characteristics
- Type: cD;E+?
- Size: ~294,000 ly (90.1 kpc)

Other designations
- 2MASX J04333784-1315430, ABELL 0496:[ZAC2011] BCG, Cul 0431-133, PGC 15524, GIN 189, NVSS J043337-131542

MCG-02-12-039 also known as A496 cD, is an elliptical galaxy located in the constellation of Eridanus. The redshift of the galaxy is (z) 0.032 and it was first discovered by a group of astronomers in March 1985. It is classified as a Type-cD galaxy and is the brightest cluster galaxy, of the Abell 496 galaxy cluster.

== Description ==
MCG-02-12-039 is the dominant galaxy of Abell 496. It is known to contain a large galactic halo that is found surrounding it with many distant galaxy companions in the background. It has also been described as a weak emission line galaxy based on a study published in December 2008. There is also strong presence of extended optical emission by around 10 arcseconds from the central nucleus, mainly made up of hydrogen-alpha and singly ionized nitrogen. The estimated equivalent age of a single stellar population in the galaxy is around 1.05 ± 0.21 billion years. In the center of the galaxy, there are three dust lanes that are found to be uncurling in an anticlockwise direction, in a spiral pattern.

Evidence found the halo of the galaxy is found to display a blue profile per each increasing radius based on a B-V color profile. However, when observed in visual infrared colors, the profile is shown to be more redder. There is also a presence of an elongated stellar component with gas components also having the same morphology but to a lesser extent. The central nucleus is found to have its parts blueshifted by around 125 kilometer per seconds.

A study published in 2020 has found the presence of gas filaments in the galaxy. When observed, the gas components are described as stretched suggesting there is a common origin. Moreover, a misalignment is shown between stellar and gas kinematics, hinting interstellar gas is found to be externally accreted. The central supermassive black hole of the galaxy is estimated to be around 8.78 M_{☉}.
