= Eric B. Norman =

American physicist, academic and researcher

- Born: January 15, 1951 (age 75); Buffalo, New York
- Occupations: Physicist, academic and researcher
- Awards: Outstanding Performance Award, Lawrence Berkeley Laboratory; Fellow, American Physical Society; Outstanding Mentor Award, U. S. Department of Energy; Fellow, American Association for the Advancement of Science; Co-Recipient of Breakthrough Prize in Fundamental Physics For participation in the Sudbury Neutrino Observatory

Academic background
- Education: A. B. in Physics; S. M. in Physics; Ph. D. in Physics
- Alma mater: Cornell University; University of Chicago

Academic work
- Institutions: University of California, Berkeley

Eric B. Norman is an American physicist. He is a professor in the graduate school of the University of California, Berkeley.

He has conducted research on neutrino physics, astrophysics, and on the applications of nuclear science for homeland security and non-proliferation. He is also the co-discoverer of 4 isotopes (_{57}Cr, _{59}Mn, _{60}Mn, _{67}As).

He is a fellow of the American Physical Society and of the American Association for the Advancement of Science, and a member of American Nuclear Society. He is a reviewer of research proposals for United States Department of Energy, for the National Science Foundation and for the Natural Sciences and Engineering Research Council of Canada. Since 1995, he has been a co-developer of nuclear science wallchart and a member of the Contemporary Physics Education Project.

== Education ==
He received a bachelor's degree in physics from Cornell University in 1972, and then a master's degree in physics in 1974 and a PhD in nuclear astrophysics in 1978, both from the University of Chicago. His doctoral thesis (mentored by David Schramm and Cary Davids) involved theoretical studies of r-process nucleosynthesis and the discovery of new radioactive isotopes (^{57}Cr, ^{59}Mn, ^{60}Mn, and ^{67}As).

== Research ==
His research focuses on low-energy experimental nuclear physics, nuclear security, and medical applications of nuclear science.

=== Nuclear astrophysics ===
Norman conducted multiple experiments involving measurements of cross sections for reactions important for understanding the synthesis of elements in stars. He also led research focused on the impacts of high temperatures, and densities that occur in various astrophysical environments on the decay rates of key radioactive species such as ^{26}Al, ^{44}Ti, ^{54}Mn, and 176Lu. In another study, he demonstrated reaction rate sensitivity of ^{44}Ti production in massive stars and highlighted the implications of a thick target yield measurement of ^{40}Ca(α, γ)^{44}Ti.

=== Neutrino physics ===
Norman has worked extensively on two aspects of neutrino physics, the solar neutrino problem, and searches for neutrinoless double beta decay. In the late 1980s and early 1990s, he led a group at Lawrence Berkeley National Laboratory in its participation in the Sudbury Neutrino Observatory. His group designed and built the large geodesic structure that supported the nearly 10,000 photomultiplier tubes that were used to observe Cherenkov light from neutrino interactions in the D_{2}O (heavy water) target. He, along with co-workers also designed and built several devices that were used to accurately determine the energy calibration of the detector and also its neutron detection efficiency. SNO ultimately solved the solar neutrino problem by demonstrating that two thirds of the electron-type neutrinos produced through fusion reactions in the Sun oscillate into mu- and/or tau- neutrinos before reaching the Earth. This measurement led to the awarding of the 2015 Nobel Prize in physics and the 2015 Breakthrough Prize in Fundamental Physics.

Since 1998 Norman and his group have been involved in the Cryogenic Underground Observatory for Rare Events (CUORE). This experiment is designed to search for the neutrinoless double beta decay of 130Te, which can only occur if neutrinos have finite masses and if neutrinos are their own anti-particles. Observation of this decay mode could help to explain the origin of the matter/anti-matter asymmetry of the universe. This experiment is located in the Gran Sasso National Laboratory in Italy and utilizes approximately 1000 5 x 5 x 5-cm crystals of TeO_{2} operated as cryogenic bolometers at a temperature of approximate 10 mK.

In 2002, Norman worked at the Lawrence Livermore National Laboratory, and became involved in a project focused on screening cargo containers for special nuclear material – that is ^{235}U or ^{239}Pu. While working there, he along with his colleagues devised a scheme using fast neutrons to irradiate the cargo and then to look for high energy beta-delayed gamma rays emitted by fission products as the signature. Subsequently, his group has worked on a number of experiments in nuclear forensics designed to determine the nature and/or origins of a variety of nuclear materials.

== Awards and honors ==
- 1990–1991 - distinguished lecturer, Associated Western Universities/U. S. Department of Energy
- 1992, 2001 & 2004 - Outstanding Performance Award, Lawrence Berkeley Laboratory
- 1999 - fellow, American Physical Society
- 2002 - Outstanding Mentor Award, U. S. Department of Energy
- 2006 - Science and Technology Award, Lawrence Livermore National Laboratory
- 2012 - fellow, American Association for the Advancement of Science
- 2013 - Science and Technology Award, Physical and Life Sciences Directorate Lawrence Livermore National Laboratory
- 2015 - Co-Recipient of Breakthrough Prize in Fundamental Physics For participation in the Sudbury Neutrino Observatory
