= Misalignment mechanism =

Hypothesized effect in quantum mechanics

It is a well known fact that a quarter of the energy density of the universe is in the form of dark matter (DM). One can corroborate the presence of DM by alluding to the observational data such as anisotropies in Cosmic Microwave Background (CMB) radiation and the formation of Large scale structure in the universe. There are various schools of thought with differing positions on the nature of DM, but they mostly converge on the fact that the mass of DM lies within the range of $10^{-24}~\text{eV}$ to $10^{19}~\text{GeV}$. Such light-weight, spinless DM, with no or little self-interaction between themselves is described by the classical scalar field. The axion is an example of field-like DM.

The interaction of axions with the other particles is assumed to be too weak for axions to reach thermal equilibrium with the rest of the early universe plasma, implying that they were produced non-thermally. The production mechanism of such particles is the vacuum misalignment mechanism which is a hypothesized effect in the Peccei–Quinn theory proposed solution to the strong-CP problem in quantum mechanics. The effect occurs when a particle's field has an initial value that is not at or near a potential minimum. This causes the particle's field to oscillate around the nearest minimum, eventually dissipating energy by decaying into other particles until the minimum is attained.

In the case of hypothesized axions created in the early universe, the initial values are random because of the masslessness of axions in the high temperature plasma. Near the critical temperature of quantum chromodynamics, axions possess a temperature-dependent mass that enters a damped oscillation until the potential minimum is reached.

There are other production mechanism for cold DM axions, but it is least model dependent provided that the Hubble parameter is much greater than the axion mass $(H(t)= m(t))$ well before matter - radiation equality. The expansion of the universe acts as a friction term, freezing the axion amplitude at a constant value $\phi_i$. The action in the minimally coupled scalar field theory is given by

$S = \int d^4x \sqrt{-g} (\frac{1}{2} g^{{\mu}{\nu}}\partial_{\mu} \phi \partial_{\nu}\phi g -V(\phi))$

where $g$ is the determinant of FLRW metric $g^{\mu \nu}$. The dynamics of these particles are a Klein-Gordon equation in a homogeneous and isotropic space-time, of which scale factor a(t) evolves as determined by the Hubble parameter $H(t) = \dot a/a$. Near the minimum of its potential, where $V(\phi) = \frac{1}{2}m^2 \phi^2$, of which then behaves cosmologically as a damped harmonic oscillator:

$\ddot \phi + 3H\dot \phi + m^2 \phi = 0$

Due to the expansion of the universe,$H(t)$ dropped below $m(t)$, the damping becomes undercritical and the field can roll down and start oscillating near the bottom of the potential. In this case, the solution of field equation can be deduced by WKB approximation.

$\phi(t) \cong \phi_1 \frac{a_1(t)}{a(t)}^{3/2} cos \left(\int^t_{t_{1}} m(t) dt + \alpha \right)$

The energy density of these fields dilutes $\phi \propto a^{-3}$ with the scale factor. It can be shown that the axion density provides a fraction a of the critical density given by, $\Omega_a \sim 0.1 \left(\frac{\phi}{ 10^{17} GeV} \right)^2 \left( \frac{m}{10^{-22} eV} \right)^{1/2}$

The $\phi$ oscillations, which can be interpreted as a set of particles, therefore have the red shifting behavior of (non-relativistic) matter, making this a suitable dark matter candidate.
