= Helen Quinn =

Australian-American physicist

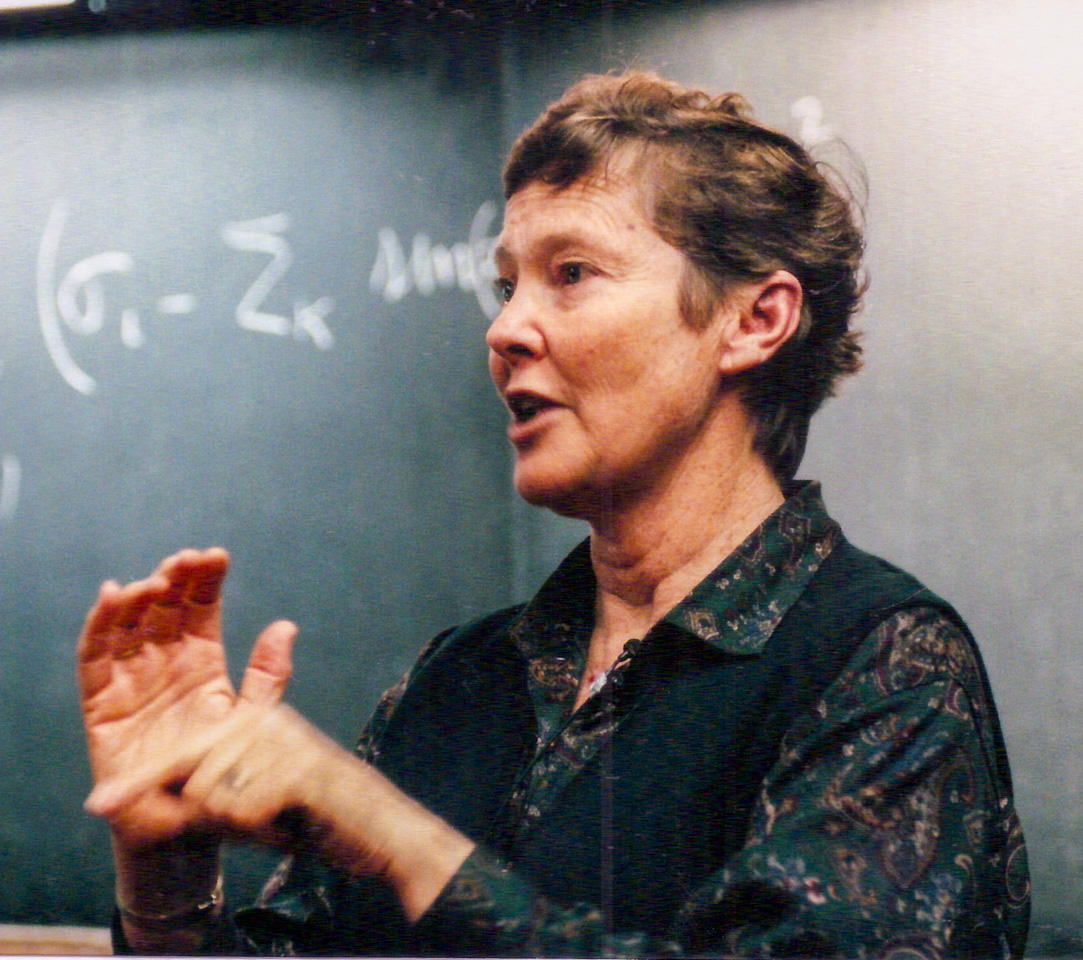
- Quinn lectures at Dirac Medal Ceremony, 2000.
- Born: Helen Rhoda Arnold; 19 May 1943 (age 83); Melbourne, Australia
- Education: Tintern Grammar; Stanford University
- Occupations: Particle physicist Educator
- Known for: Peccei–Quinn theory Hierarchy of interactions in unified gauge theories A Framework for K-12 Science Education
- Awards: Dirac Medal (ICTP) (2000); Order of Australia (2005); Oskar Klein Medal (2008); Sakurai Prize (2013); Karl Taylor Compton Medal (2016); Benjamin Franklin Medal (2018); Harvey Prize (2023)
- Scientific career
- Workplaces: Harvard University, SLAC National Accelerator Laboratory, Stanford University
- Doctoral advisor: James Bjorken

Helen Rhoda Arnold Quinn (born 19 May 1943) is an Australian-born particle physicist and educator who has made major contributions to both fields. Her contributions to theoretical physics include the Peccei–Quinn theory which implies a corresponding symmetry of nature(related to matter-antimatter symmetry and the possible source of the dark matter that pervades the universe) and contributions to the search for a unified theory for the three types of particle interactions (strong, electromagnetic, and weak). As Chair of the Board on Science Education of the National Academy of Sciences, Quinn led the effort that produced A Framework for K-12 Science Education: Practices, Crosscutting Concepts, and Core Ideas—the basis for the Next Generation Science Standards adopted by many states. Her honours include the Dirac Medal of the International Center for Theoretical Physics, the Oskar Klein Medal from the Royal Swedish Academy of Sciences, appointment as an Honorary Officer of the Order of Australia, the J. J. Sakurai Prize for Theoretical Particle Physics from the American Physical Society, the Karl Taylor Compton Medal for Leadership in Physics from the American Institute of Physics, the 2018 Benjamin Franklin Medal in Physics from the Franklin Institute, and the 2023 Harvey Prize from Technion -- Israel Institute of Technology.

== Life ==
Quinn grew up in Australia. Of her childhood with her three brothers, she says, "I learned very young how to make myself heard." She graduated in 1959 from Tintern Grammar, Tintern Church of England Girls' Grammar School, in Ringwood East, Victoria, Australia. She began college at the University of Melbourne before moving to the United States and transferring to Stanford University. She received her PhD from Stanford in 1967, at a time when less than 2% of physicists were women. She did her postdoctoral work at the DESY (the German Synchrotron Laboratory) in Hamburg, Germany. She next spent seven years at Harvard University before returning to Stanford, where she became a professor of physics in the Theory Group at the SLAC National Accelerator Laboratory, then known as the Stanford Linear Accelerator Center. She retired in 2010 and devoted her efforts to education, especially K-12 and preschool science and multilingual education.

== Professional contributions ==
Working with Howard Georgi and Steven Weinberg, Quinn showed how the three types of particle interactions (strong, electromagnetic, and weak), which look very different as we see their impact in the world around us, become very similar in extremely high-energy processes and so might be three aspects of a single unified force.

With Roberto Peccei, she originated Peccei–Quinn theory, which suggested a possible near-symmetry of the universe (now known as Peccei–Quinn symmetry) to explain how strong interactions can maintain CP-symmetry (the symmetry between matter and antimatter) when weak interactions do not. One consequence of this theory is a particle known as the axion which has yet to be observed but is one candidate for the dark matter that pervades the universe.

She showed how the physics of quarks can be used to predict certain aspects of the physics of hadrons (which are particles made from quarks) regardless of the details of the hadron's structure (with Enrico Poggio and Steven Weinberg). This useful property is now known as quark-hadron duality.

She has given public talks in various countries on "The Missing Antimatter", in which she suggests that this area of research is promising.

In 2001, she was elected to become president of the American Physical Society for the year 2004. She was the fourth woman to be elected to the APS presidential line in the Society's 102-year history.

Quinn has had a long term engagement in education issues. She was a cofounder and the first president of the Contemporary Physics Education Project, and helped design its first product, the chart of Fundamental Particles and Interactions that appears on many schoolhouse walls next to the periodic table chart. CPEP received the 2017 "Excellence in Physics Education Award" from the American Physical Society, "for leadership in providing educational materials on contemporary physics topics to students for over 25 years."

She was elected to the National Academy of Sciences (NAS) while she was a staff member at SLAC; she was soon made a full professor of physics at Stanford. As a member of NAS, she joined the Board on Science Education of the National Research Council and has served on a number of its studies. She served as chair of this board for the years 2009–2014.

After retiring from Stanford, she spent her full effort on education. She planned and led the work of the NRC study committee that produced A Framework for K-12 Science Education to guide the development of multi-state standards for science education. These "Next Generation Science Standards" were released in final form in April, 2013. NGSS has been officially adopted by many states and the District of Columbia. Since the release of the Framework, she has worked to support the ongoing process of development, adoption, and implementation of the NGSS. With Okhee Lee and Guadalupe Valdez, she studied the opportunities for teaching English to English language learners in the context of NGSS.

In 2015, the President of Ecuador appointed her as a member of the board (Comision Gestora) charged with leading the new National University of Education.

== Career ==
Her professional career is as follows:

- 1967–68 Research Associate in Physics, SLAC
- 1968–70 Guest Scientist, Deutsches Elektronen-Synchrotron (DESY), Hamburg, Germany
- 1971–72 Honorary Research Fellow, Harvard University
- 1972–75 Assistant Professor of Physics, Harvard University
- 1976–77 Associate Professor of Physics, Harvard University
- 1977–78 Visiting Associate Professor, Stanford University
- 1978–79 Research Associate, SLAC, Stanford University
- 1979–2003 Member, Scientific Staff, SLAC, Stanford University
- 1988–2004 Education and Public Outreach Manager, SLAC, Stanford University
- 1988–2004 Cofounder and first president of the Contemporary Physics Education Project (CPEP)
- 2003–10 Professor of Physics, Stanford Linear Accelerator Center (SLAC), Stanford University
- 2004 President of the American Physical Society
- 2005 Australian Institute of Physics Lecture Tour in celebration of the International Year of Physics
- 2009–14 Chair of the Board on Science Education of the National Academy of Sciences
- 2010 - Professor emerita, SLAC, Stanford University
- 2015–2018 Member of the board (Comision Gestora) of the National University for Education (UNAE) in Ecuador.
- January 2019 - Chair of the board of the Concord Consortium, a nonprofit organization creating educational technology for STEM learning.

== Honours ==
- 2024 Matteucci Medal of Accademia Nazionale delle Scienze, Rome, Italy. She is the fourth woman to receive this award since it was established in 1868, following Marie Curie, Irène Joliot-Curie, and Jocelyn Bell Burnell.
- 2023 Harvey Prize of Technion -- Israel Institute of Technology.
- 2023 an honoree by the Carnegie Corporation of New York's Great Immigrant Award.
- 2021 David M. Lee Historical Lecture in Physics, Harvard University: "A window on particle physics at Harvard in the early 1970's".
- 2019 J. Robert Oppenheimer Lecture, University of California, Berkeley: "Teaching for Learning: What I have learned from learning research". A video of this lecture is available.
- 2018 Honorary Degree, Doctor of Science, from the Australian National University, for her "exceptional contributions to theoretical physics and science education." She was a keynote speaker at graduation.
- 2018 Awarded the 2018 Benjamin Franklin Medal in Physics of the Franklin Institute, "for her pioneering contributions to the long-term quest for a unified theory of the strong, weak, and electromagnetic interactions of fundamental particles."
- 2017 Selected to give the annual Dirac Lecture at Cambridge University, sponsored jointly by St John's College and the Department of Applied Mathematics and Theoretical Physics of the University of Cambridge. Her topic: "Antimatter: Dirac's incredible prediction and its consequences." She was the first woman scientist to be selected since the lecture series was begun in 1986.
- 2017 Inducted to the "Avenue of Excellence" at Tintern Grammar, in the first class of inductees. The "Avenue of Excellence" on the Tintern campus honors Tintern graduates, and aims to inspire current and future students to pursue excellence.
- 2016 Karl Taylor Compton Medal for Leadership in Physics from the American Institute of Physics "for her leadership in promoting K-12 education and outreach, including the development of standards and approaches to science education that have had an enormous influence at the local, state, national and international levels, and for her broad and deep contributions to the advancement of theoretical particle physics."
- 2016 Member of the American Philosophical Society
- 2013 J. J. Sakurai Prize for Theoretical Particle Physics from the American Physical Society (With Roberto Peccei): "For their proposal of the elegant mechanism to resolve the famous problem of strong-CP violation which, in turn, led to the invention of axions, a subject of intense experimental and theoretical investigation for more than three decades."
- 2008 Oskar Klein Medal from the Royal Swedish Academy of Sciences. She was the first woman to receive this award.
- 2005 appointed an Honorary Officer of the Order of Australia, "for service to scientific research in the field of theoretical physics and to education" (the award was honorary because Quinn was no longer an Australian citizen)
- 2005 Honorary Degree, Doctor of Science, from the University of Melbourne
- 2005 Karl F. Herzfeld Memorial Lecture, Catholic University of America: "The Asymmetry Between Matter and Antimatter in the Universe and in the Laws of Physics".
- 2004 President, American Physical Society
- 2003 Member of the United States National Academy of Sciences
- 2002 Honorary Degree, Doctor of Science, Honoris Causa, from University of Notre Dame
- 2000 Dirac Medal of the International Center for Theoretical Physics, Trieste, Italy (with Howard Georgi and Jogesh Pati) "for pioneering contributions to the quest for a unified theory of quarks and leptons and of the strong, weak, and electromagnetic interactions". She was the first woman to receive this award.
- 1998 Fellow of the American Academy of Arts and Sciences
- 1984 Fellow of the American Physical Society, "For contributions to gauge theories of elementary particles, including influential work on renormalization in grand unified theories and studies of CP violation which led to the idea of the axion."
- 1974 Sloan Research Fellowship

== Selected publications ==
=== For the general reader ===
- The Mystery of the Missing Antimatter, Helen R. Quinn and Yossi Nir, illustrated by Rutu Modan, Princeton University Press, Princeton, NJ (2008). (ISBN 9780691133096)
- The Charm of Strange Quarks: Mysteries and Revolutions of Particle Physics, R. Michael Barnett, Henry Muehry, and Helen R. Quinn, Springer-Verlag, New York (2000). (ISBN 0-387-98897-1)
- "Belief and Knowledge — a Plea about Language", Physics Today, January 2007.
- "What is Science?", Physics Today, July 2009.
- Quinn, Helen; Nir, Yossi (2008). "How the cosmos was conquered". New Scientist. 198 (2651). Elsevier BV: 26–29. doi:10.1016/s0262-4079(08)60913-6. ISSN 0262-4079.

=== Education publications ===
- "Science and Mathematics Education", Jeremy Kilpatrick and Helen Quinn, Ed. An Education Policy White Paper of the National Academy of Education. (2009)
- A Framework for K-12 Science Education: Practices, Crosscutting Concepts, and Core Ideas, National Academies Press, Washington DC (2012). (ISBN 978-0-309-21742-2) Quinn was the chair of the committee producing this report and a principal author. (Ref: see page vi of the report.)
- "Science and Language for English Language Learners", Okhee Lee, Helen R. Quinn and Guadalupe Valdes, Education Researcher 42(4) 93-127 (2013).

=== Theoretical physics ===
- Appelquist, T.; Quinn, H.R. (April 1972). "Divergence cancellations in a simplified Weak Interaction Model". Physics Letters B. 39 (2): 229–232. Bibcode:1972PhLB...39..229A. doi:10.1016/0370-2693(72)90783-6.
- Georgi, H.; Quinn, H.R.; Weinberg, S. (1974). "Hierarchy of interactions in Unified Gauge Theories". Physical Review Letters. 33 (7): 451–4. Bibcode:1974PhRvL..33..451G. doi:10.1103/PhysRevLett.33.451.
- Poggio, E.C.; Quinn, H.R.; Weinberg, S. (1976). "Smearing method in the quark model". Physical Review D. 13 (7): 1958–1968. Bibcode:1976PhRvD..13.1958P. doi:10.1103/PhysRevD.13.1958.
- Peccei, R.D.; Quinn, H.R. (1977). "CP conservation in the presence of pseudoparticles". Physical Review Letters. 38 (25): 1440–3. Bibcode:1977PhRvL..38.1440P. doi:10.1103/PhysRevLett.38.1440.
- Peccei, R. D.; Quinn, Helen R. (15 September 1977). "Constraints imposed by CP conservation in the presence of pseudoparticles". Physical Review D. 16 (6). American Physical Society (APS): 1791–1797. Bibcode:1977PhRvD..16.1791P. doi:10.1103/physrevd.16.1791. ISSN 0556-2821.
- Snyder, Arthur E.; Quinn, Helen R. (1 September 1993). "Measuring CP asymmetry in B→ρπ decays without ambiguities". Physical Review D. 48 (5). American Physical Society (APS): 2139–2144. doi:10.1103/physrevd.48.2139. ISSN 0556-2821. PMID 10016451.
- Nir, Y; Quinn, H R (1992). "CP Violation in B Physics". Annual Review of Nuclear and Particle Science. 42 (1). Annual Reviews: 211–250. Bibcode:1992ARNPS..42..211N. doi:10.1146/annurev.ns.42.120192.001235. ISSN 0163-8998.
