= Zavattini =

Zavattini (pronounced [dzavatˈtiːni]) is an Italian surname, derived from a plural term for 'shoemaker' or 'cobbler' (cf. modern standard Italian ciabattino). Notable people with the surname include:

- Agostino Zavattini (1928–1995), Italian politician
- Arturo Zavattini (born 1930), Italian photographer and cinematographer
- Cesare Zavattini (1902–1989), Italian screenwriter and Neorealist theorist
- Emilio Zavattini (1927–2007), Italian physicist
- Marco Zavattini (1934–2023), Italian screenwriter, son of Cesare

== See also ==
- Ciabattoni
- Zavatta
- Zavattari
- Zavattiero
