= Axino =

Fermionic superpartner of the axion

The axino is a hypothetical elementary particle predicted by some theories of particle physics. Peccei–Quinn theory attempts to explain the observed phenomenon known as the strong CP problem by introducing a hypothetical real scalar particle called the axion. Adding supersymmetry to the model predicts the existence of a fermionic superpartner for the axion, the axino, and a bosonic superpartner, the saxion. They are all bundled up in a chiral superfield.

The axino has been predicted to be the lightest supersymmetric particle in such a model. In part due to this property, it is considered a candidate for the composition of dark matter.

The supermultiplet containing an axion and axino has been suggested as the origin of supersymmetry breaking, where the supermultiplet gains an F-term expectation value.
