= Mississippi State Axion Search =

- MASS Collaboration
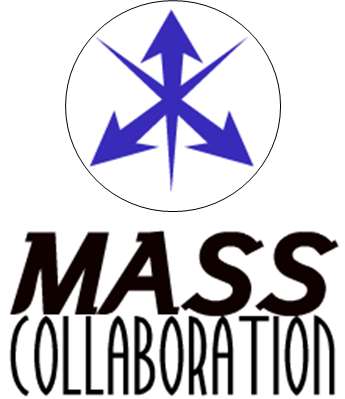
- Collaboration logo

Experiment Information
- Location: Mississippi State University, Hilbun Hall
- Type: Light Shining Through a Wall Experiment (LSW)
- EM Source: .7m, 50W continuous radio wave emitter
- Expected Run: 1 year
- Physics Goal: To place limits between the mass and coupling constant of axion like particles and para- photons.

Mississippi State Axion Search is the first of its kind light shining through the wall experiment designed to operate using a continuous radio wave emitter as the source of photons. The experiment contains a radio source and a set of detectors separated by a wall. The aim of the experiment is to limit the mass and coupling constants of an axion like particle or a para photon by looking at the photons on the dark side of the tuned cavity. The experiment is projected to be completed by 2016.

== Collaboration ==
The collaboration currently includes members from the following institutions;

- Mississippi State University
