= Theta vacuum =

Yang–Mills theory vacuum state

In quantum field theory, the theta vacuum is the semi-classical vacuum state of non-abelian Yang–Mills theories specified by the vacuum angle θ that arises when the state is written as a superposition of an infinite set of topologically distinct vacuum states. The dynamical effects of the vacuum are captured in the Lagrangian formalism through the presence of a θ-term which in quantum chromodynamics leads to the fine tuning problem known as the strong CP problem. It was discovered in 1976 by Curtis Callan, Roger Dashen, and David Gross, and independently by Roman Jackiw and Claudio Rebbi.

== Yang–Mills vacuum ==
=== Topological vacua ===
The semi-classical vacuum structure of non-abelian Yang–Mills theories is often investigated in Euclidean spacetime in some fixed gauge such as the temporal gauge $A_0 = 0$. Classical ground states of this theory have a vanishing field strength tensor which corresponds to pure gauge configurations $A_i = i\Omega \nabla_i \Omega^{-1}$, where at each point in spacetime $\Omega(x)$ is some gauge transformation belonging to the non-abelian gauge group $G$. To ensure that the action is finite, $\Omega(x)$ approaches some fixed value $\Omega_\infty$ as $|\boldsymbol x|\rightarrow \infty$. Since all points at spatial infinity now behave as a single new point, the spatial manifold $\mathbb R^3$ behaves as a 3-sphere $S^3 = \mathbb R^3 \cup \{\infty\}$ so that every pure gauge choice for the gauge field is described by a mapping $\Omega(x): S^3 \rightarrow G$.

When every ground state configuration can be smoothly transformed into every other ground state configuration through a smooth gauge transformation then the theory has a single vacuum state, but if there are topologically distinct configurations then it has multiple vacua. This is because if there are two different configurations that are not smoothly connected, then to transform one into the other one must pass through a configuration with non-vanishing field strength tensor, which will have non-zero energy. This means that there is an energy barrier between the two vacua, making them distinct.

The question of whether two gauge configurations can be smoothly deformed into each other is formally described by the homotopy group of the mapping $\Omega(x): S^3 \rightarrow G$. For example, the gauge group $G=\text{SU}(2)$ has an underlying manifold of $S^3$ so that the mapping is $\Omega(x):S^3 \rightarrow S^3$, which has a homotopy group of $\pi_3(\text{SU}(2)) = \mathbb Z$. This means that every mapping has some integer associated with it called its winding number, also known as its Pontryagin index, with it roughly describing to how many times the spatial $S^3$ is mapped onto the group $S^3$, with negative windings occurring due to a flipped orientation. Only mappings with the same winding number can be smoothly deformed into each other and are said to belong to the same homotopy class. Gauge transformations which preserve the winding number are called small gauge transformations while ones that change the winding number are called large gauge transformations.

For other non-abelian gauge groups $G$ it is sufficient to focus on one of their $\text{SU}(2)$ subgroups, ensuring that $\pi_3(G) = \mathbb Z$. This is because every mapping of $S^3$ onto $G$ can be continuously deformed into a mapping onto an $\text{SU}(2)$ subgroup of $G$, a result that follows from Botts theorem. This is in contrast to abelian gauge groups where every mapping $S^3\rightarrow \text{U}(1)$ can be deformed to the constant map and so there is a single connected vacuum state. For a gauge field configuration $A^i$, one can always calculate its winding number from a volume integral which in the temporal gauge is given by

$$n = \frac{ig^3}{24\pi^2}\int d^3 r \ \text{Tr}(\epsilon_{ijk}A^iA^jA^k),$$

where $g$ is the coupling constant. The different classes of vacuum states with different winding numbers $|n\rangle$ are referred to as topological vacua.

=== Theta vacua ===
Topological vacua are not candidate vacuum states of Yang–Mills theories since they are not eigenstates of large gauge transformations and thus are not gauge invariant. Instead acting on the state $|n\rangle$ with a large gauge transformation $\Omega_{m}$ with winding number $m$ will map it to a different topological vacuum $\Omega_m|n\rangle = |n+m\rangle$. The true vacuum has to be an eigenstate of both small and large gauge transformations. Similarly to the form that eigenstates take in periodic potentials according to Bloch's theorem, the vacuum state is a coherent sum of topological vacua

$$|\theta\rangle = \sum_n e^{in\theta}|n\rangle.$$

This set of states indexed by the angular variable $\theta \in [0,2\pi)$ are known as θ-vacua. They are eigenstates of both types of gauge transformations since now $\Omega_m|\theta\rangle = e^{-i\theta m}|\theta\rangle$. In pure Yang–Mills, each value of $\theta$ will give a different ground state on which excited states are built, leading to different physics. In other words, the Hilbert space decomposes into superselection sectors since expectation values of gauge invariant operators between two different θ-vacua vanish $\langle \theta|\mathcal O |\theta' \rangle = 0$ if $\theta \neq \theta'$.

Yang–Mills theories exhibit finite action solutions to their equations of motion called instantons. They are responsible for tunnelling between different topological vacua with an instanton with winding number $\nu$ being responsible for a tunnelling from a topological vacuum $|n_-\rangle$ to $|n_+\rangle = |n_-+\nu\rangle$. Instantons with $\nu=\pm 1$ are known as BPST instantons. Without any tunnelling the different θ-vacua would be degenerate, however instantons lift the degeneracy, making the various different θ-vacua physically distinct from each other. The ground state energy of the different vacua is split to take the form $E(\theta) \propto \cos \theta$, where the constant of proportionality will depend on how strong the instanton tunnelling is.

The complicated structure of the θ-vacuum can be directly incorporated into the Yang–Mills Lagrangian by considering the vacuum-vacuum transitions in the path integral formalism

$$\lim_{T \rightarrow \infty}\langle \theta|e^{-iHT}|\theta\rangle = \int \mathcal D A e^{iS+ i\int d^4 x \mathcal L_\theta}.$$

Here $H$ is the Hamiltonian, $S$ the Yang–Mills action, and $\mathcal L_\theta$ is a new CP violating contribution to the Lagrangian called the θ-term

$$\mathcal L_\theta =\theta \frac{g^2}{32 \pi^2}\text{Tr}[F^{\mu \nu}\tilde F_{\mu \nu}],$$

where $\tilde F^{\mu \nu} = \tfrac{1}{2}\epsilon^{\mu \nu \rho \sigma}F_{\rho \sigma}$ is the dual field strength tensor and the trace is over the group generators. This term is a total derivative meaning that it can be written in the form $\mathcal L_\theta = \partial_\mu K^\mu$. In contrast to other total derivatives that can be added to the Lagrangian, this one has physical consequences in non-perturbative physics because $K^\mu$ is not gauge invariant. In quantum chromodynamics the presence of this term leads to the strong CP problem since it gives rise to a neutron electric dipole moment which has not yet been observed, requiring the fine tuning of $\theta$ to be very small.

== Modification due to fermions ==
If massless fermions are present in the theory then the vacuum angle becomes unobservable because the fermions suppress the instanton tunnelling between topological vacua. This can be seen by considering a Yang–Mills theory with a single massless fermion $\psi(x)$. In the path integral formalism the tunnelling by an instanton between two topological vacua takes the form

$$\begin{align}
\langle n|n+\nu\rangle & \sim \int \mathcal D A \mathcal D \psi \mathcal D \bar \psi \exp\bigg(-\int d^4 x \frac{1}{2g^2}\text{tr} F^{\mu \nu}F_{\mu \nu}+i\bar \psi {D\!\!\!/} \psi\bigg) \\
& \sim \int \mathcal D A \det (i{D\!\!\!/}) \exp\bigg(-\int d^4x \frac{1}{2g^2}\text{tr} F^{\mu \nu}F_{\mu \nu}\bigg).
\end{align}$$

This differs from the pure Yang–Mills result by the fermion determinant acquired after integrating over the fermionic fields. The determinant vanishes because the Dirac operator with massless fermions has at least one zero eigenvalue for any instanton configuration. While instantons no longer contribute to tunnelling between topological vacua, they instead play a role in violating axial charge and thus give rise to the chiral condensate. If instead the theory has very light fermions then the θ-term is still present, but its effects are heavily suppressed as they must be proportional to the fermion masses.

== See also ==
- Instanton
- Strong CP problem
- Vafa–Witten theorem
