= Roberto Peccei =

American physicist (1942–2020)

- Born: Roberto Daniele Peccei; January 6, 1942; Torino, Italy
- Died: June 1, 2020 (aged 78)
- Education: Massachusetts Institute of Technology (B.S., Ph.D.); New York University (M.S.)
- Known for: Peccei–Quinn theory Majoron
- Awards: J.J. Sakurai Prize (2013)
- Scientific career
- Fields: Particle physics
- Institutions: University of Washington (1969-1971); Stanford University (1971–1978); Max Planck Institute (1978–1984); DESY (1984–1989); UCLA (1989–2020)
- Thesis: The chiral dynamic method and its applications in high energy physics (1969)
- Doctoral advisor: Kenneth Alan Johnson
- Doctoral students: Marcela Carena

Roberto Daniele Peccei (Italian: [petˈtʃɛi]; January 6, 1942 – June 1, 2020) was a theoretical particle physicist whose principal interests lay in the area of electroweak interactions and in the interface between particle physics and physical cosmology. He was most known for formulating the Peccei–Quinn theory (with Helen Quinn), which attempts to resolve the strong CP problem in particle physics.

Peccei was a vice chancellor for research at the University of California, Los Angeles between 2000 and 2010.

== Early life and education ==
The son of Aurelio Peccei (founder of the Club of Rome), Roberto Peccei was born in 1942 in Torino, Italy. He completed his secondary school in Argentina, and came to the United States in 1958 to pursue his university studies in physics. He obtained a B.S. from MIT in 1962, and M.S. from New York University (NYU) in 1964 and a Ph.D. from the MIT Center for Theoretical Physics in 1969.

== Career ==
After a brief period of postdoctoral work at the University of Washington, he joined the faculty of Stanford University in 1971, where (with Helen Quinn) he originated Peccei–Quinn theory, still the most famous proposed solution to the strong CP problem. In 1978, he returned to Europe as a staff member of the Max Planck Institute in Munich, Germany. He joined the Deutsches Elektronen-Synchrotron (DESY) Laboratory in Hamburg, Germany, as the head of the Theoretical Group in 1984. He returned to the United States in 1989, joining the faculty of the Department of Physics at UCLA. Soon thereafter, he became chair of the department, a position he held until becoming dean of the division of physical sciences of the College of Letters and Sciences in 1993.

Until his death in June 2020, Peccei was on the editorial board of Nuclear Physics B Supplement, and the Journal of Physics G. He was a member of the Club of Rome, a trustee of the World Academy of Art and Science and president of the Fondazione Aurelio Peccei and he was a Fellow of both the American Physical Society and the Institute of Physics in the United Kingdom. In the last 15 years, he served on numerous advisory boards both in Europe and in the U.S. He chaired both the scientific advisory board for the Laboratory for Nuclear Science at Cornell University and the visiting committee for the Laboratory of Nuclear Science at MIT. He also was a member of the visiting committee for the Department of Physics at MIT and was the convener of the vice chancellor for Research Council in the University of California.

== Honors and awards ==
- Fellow of the American Physical Society
- Recipient of the American Physical Society’s 2013 J. J. Sakurai Prize for Theoretical Particle Physics

== Publications ==
- Peccei, Roberto D.; Quinn, Helen R. (1977). "CP Conservation in the Presence of Pseudoparticles". Physical Review Letters. 38 (25): 1440. Bibcode:1977PhRvL..38.1440P. doi:10.1103/PhysRevLett.38.1440.
- Peccei, Roberto D.; Quinn, Helen R. (1977). "Constraints imposed by CP conservation in the presence of pseudoparticles". Physical Review D. 16 (6): 1791. Bibcode:1977PhRvD..16.1791P. doi:10.1103/PhysRevD.16.1791.
