= Ciabattoni =

Ciabattoni (pronounced [tʃabatˈtoːni]) is an Italian surname from Ascoli Piceno and Teramo, derived from a plural term for 'shoemaker' or 'cobbler' (cf. modern standard Italian ciabattino, and the bread type ciabatta). Notable people with the surname include:

- Agata Ciabattoni, Italian mathematician
- Alex Ciabattoni (born 1994), Australian basketball player

== See also ==
- Zavattini
