= Axion Dark Matter Experiment =

Experiment using a resonant microwave cavity to find dark matter particles

The Axion Dark Matter Experiment (ADMX, also written as Axion Dark Matter eXperiment in the project's documentation) is an experiment that uses a resonant microwave cavity within a large superconducting magnet to search for cold dark matter axions in the local galactic dark matter halo. Unusual for a dark matter detector, it is not located deep underground. Sited at the Center for Experimental Nuclear Physics and Astrophysics (CENPA) at the University of Washington, ADMX is a large collaborative effort with researchers from universities and laboratories around the world.

== Background ==
The axion is a hypothetical elementary particle originally postulated to solve the strong CP problem. The axion is also an extremely attractive dark matter candidate. The axion is the puzzle piece allowing these two mysteries to fit naturally into our understanding of the universe.

=== Strong CP problem ===
The axion was originally postulated to exist as part of the solution to the "strong CP problem". This problem arose from the observation that the strong force holding nuclei together and the weak force making nuclei decay differ in the amount of CP violation in their interactions. Weak interaction was expected to feed into the strong interactions (QCD), yielding appreciable QCD CP violation, but no such violation has been observed to very high accuracy. One solution to this Strong CP Problem introduces a new particle called the axion. If the axion is very light, it interacts so weakly that it would be nearly impossible to detect but would be an ideal dark matter candidate. The ADMX experiment aims to detect this extraordinarily weakly coupled particle.

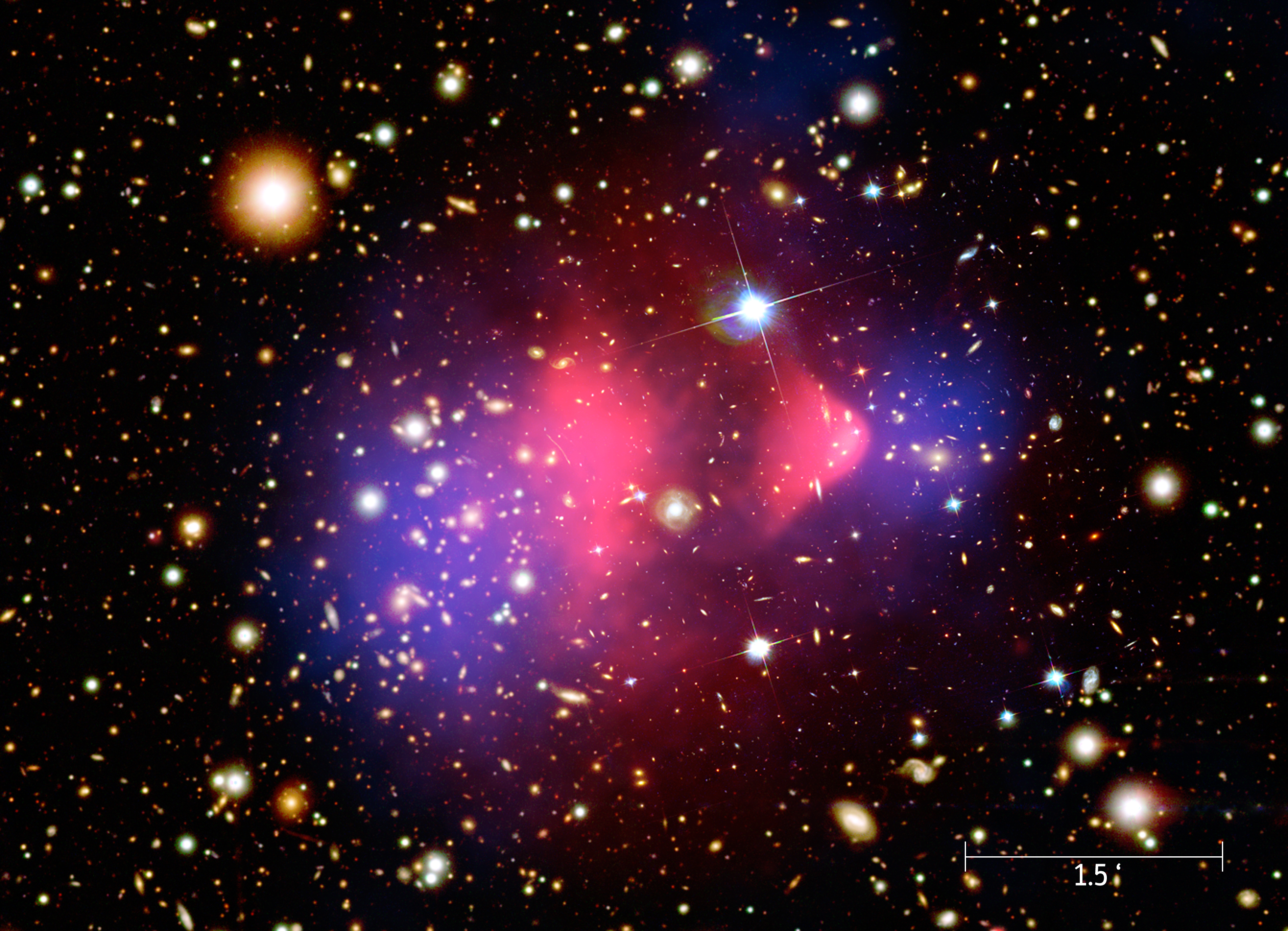
The Bullet Cluster: HST image with overlays. The total projected mass distribution reconstructed from strong and weak gravitational lensing is shown in blue, while the X-ray emitting hot gas observed with the Chandra telescope is shown in red.

=== Dark matter ===
Although dark matter can't be seen directly, its gravitational interactions with familiar matter leave unmistakable evidence for its existence. The universe today would not look the same without dark matter. Approximately five times more abundant than ordinary matter, the nature of dark matter remains one of the biggest mysteries in physics. In addition to solving the strong CP problem, the axion could provide an answer to the question "what is dark matter made of?" The axion is a neutral particle that is extraordinarily weakly interacting and could be produced in the right amount to constitute dark matter. If the dark matter accounting for the bulk of all matter in our universe is axions, ADMX is one of only a few experiments to date able to detect it.

== History ==
Pierre Sikivie invented the axion haloscope in 1983. After smaller scale experiments at the University of Florida demonstrated the practicality of the axion haloscope, ADMX was constructed at Lawrence Livermore National Laboratory in 1995. In 2010 ADMX moved to the Center for Experimental Physics and Astrophysics (CENPA) at the University of Washington. Led by Dr. Leslie Rosenberg, ADMX is undergoing an upgrade that will allow it to be sensitive to a broad range of plausible dark matter axion masses and couplings.

== Experiment ==
The experiment is designed to detect the weak conversion of dark matter axions into microwave photons in the presence of a strong magnetic field. If the hypothesis is correct, an apparatus consisting of an 8 tesla magnet and a cryogenically cooled high-Q tunable microwave cavity should stimulate the conversion of axions into photons. When the cavity's resonant frequency is tuned to the axion mass, the interaction between nearby axions in the Milky Way halo and ADMX's magnetic field is enhanced. This results in the deposit of a tiny amount of power (less than a yoctowatt) into the cavity.

An extraordinarily sensitive microwave receiver allows the weak axion signal to be extracted from the noise. The experiment receiver features quantum-limited noise performance delivered by a Superconducting QUantum Interference Device (SQUID) amplifier and lower temperatures from a ^{3}He refrigerator. ADMX is the first experiment sensitive to realistic dark-matter axion masses and couplings and the improved detector allows a more sensitive search.

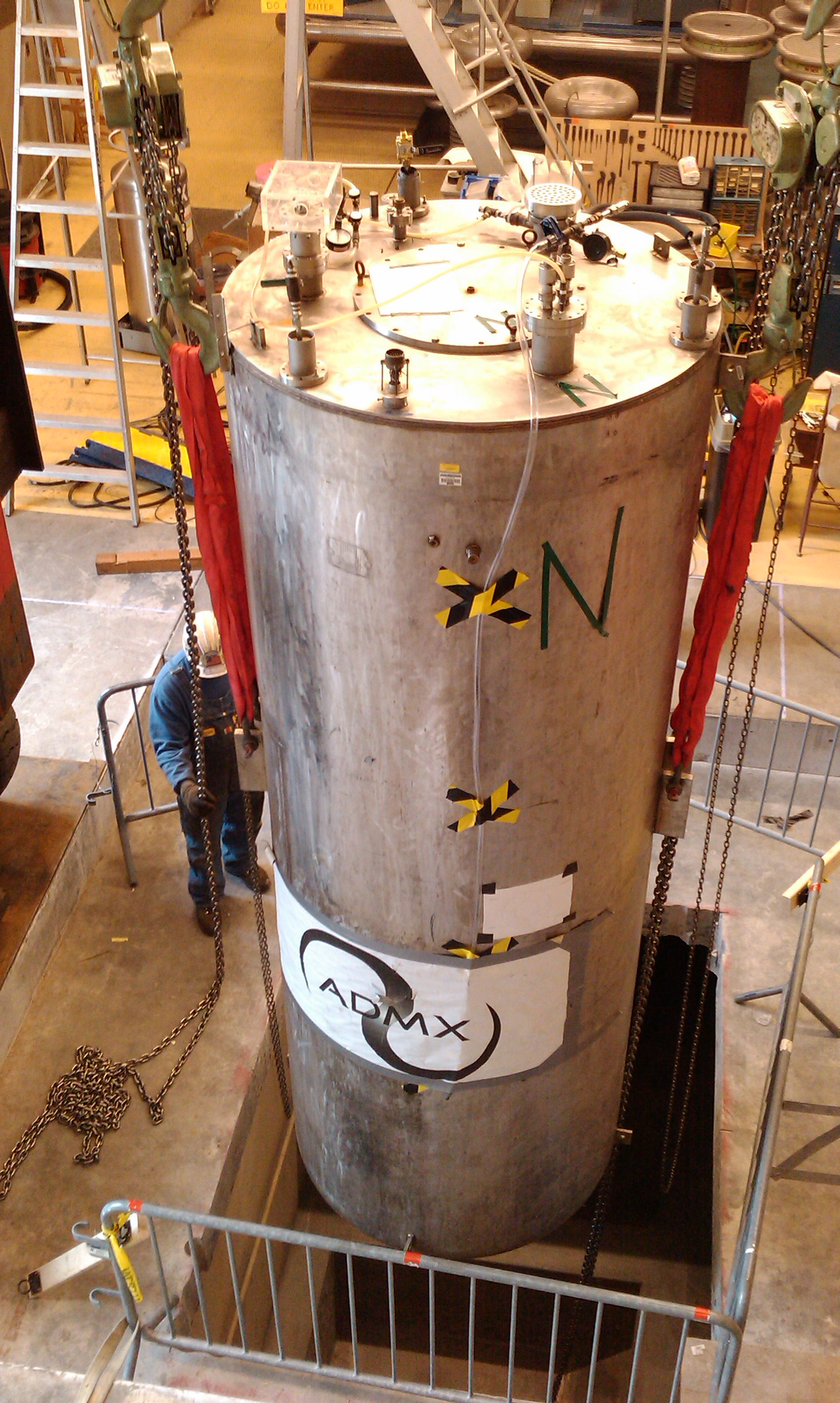
The ADMX magnet being installed at the University of Washington; although installed below the floor, the detector is in a surface laboratory.

=== Cavity ===
The microwave cavity within the magnet bore is at the heart of ADMX. It is a circular cylinder, 1 meter long and 0.5 meter diameter. ADMX searches for axions by slowly scanning the cavity resonant frequency by adjusting positions of two tuning rods within the cavity. A signal appears when the cavity resonant frequency matches the axion mass.

The expected signal from axion decay is so small that the entire experiment is cooled to well below 4.2 kelvin with a liquid helium refrigerator to minimize thermal noise. The electric field within the cavity is sampled by a tiny antenna connected to an ultra-low-noise microwave receiver.

=== Receiver ===
The ultra-low noise microwave receiver makes the experiment possible. The dominant background is thermal noise arising from the cavity and the receiver electronics. Signals from the cavity are amplified by a Superconducting QUantum Interference Device (SQUID) amplifier followed by ultralow noise cryogenic HFET amplifiers. The receiver then downconverts microwave cavity frequencies to a lower frequency that can be easily digitized and saved. The receiver chain is sensitive to powers smaller than 10 rontowatts; this is the world's lowest-noise microwave receiver in a production environment.

== Progress ==
In 2010, ADMX eliminated one of the two axion benchmark models from 1.9 μeV to 3.53 μeV, assuming axions saturate the Milky Way's halo. A 2016 upgrade should allow the ADMX to exclude or discover 1 μeV to 40 μeV dark matter axions.

=== SQUID amplifiers ===
In the first implementation of the experiment in 1996, the amplifier noise temperature was around 2 K. In 2009, the first stage amplifier was replaced by a SQUID amplifier, which greatly lowered the noise (to less than 100 mK) and vastly improved sensitivity. ADMX has demonstrated that the SQUID amplifier allows for quantum-limited-power sensitivity. In 2016, ADMX acquired Josephson Parametric Amplifiers which allow quantum noise limited searches at higher frequencies.

=== Dilution refrigerator ===
The addition of a dilution refrigerator was the main focus of the 2016 upgrade program. The dilution refrigerator allows cooling the apparatus to 100 mK or less, reducing the noise to 150 mK, which makes data taking 400 times faster. This makes it the "Definitive Experiment".

=== Related searches ===
The Haloscope at Yale Sensitive to Axion CDM, or HAYSTAC (formerly known as ADMX-High Frequency), hosted at Yale University, is using a Josephson Parametric Amplifier, 9 T magnet, and microwave cavity with radius of 5 cm and height 25 cm to search masses 19–24 μeV.

ADMX-Orpheus is a secondary ADMX experiment demonstrating the use of dielectrically loaded Fabry–Pérot cavity to search for higher mass axions and dark photons near 70 μeV. In 2022, Orpheus reported results of a first search between 65.5 μeV (15.8 GHz) and 69.3 μeV (16.8 GHz). With hardware upgrades, Orpheus is projected to perform searches from 45 to 80 μeV.
