= Robert F. Tinker =

- Born: Robert Frederick Tinker; December 11, 1941; Wilmington, Delaware, United States
- Died: June 21, 2017 (aged 75)
- Education: Wilmington Friends School; Stanford University; MIT
- Known for: Probeware
- Awards: NECC Lifetime Achievement Award (1999); Ed*Net Decade of Achievement Award (1991)
- Scientific career
- Fields: Physics, Education Technology
- Workplaces: MIT
- Doctoral advisor: John G. King

Robert Frederick Tinker (December 11, 1941 – June 21, 2017) was an American physicist, science educator, and education technology innovator, who pioneered constructivist approaches to education, particularly novel uses of educational technology in science. He is known for leading the initiation of probeware for education. He was also the creator, with Monica Bradsher of the National Geographic Society, of the first global kids online science network, the National Geographic Kids Network,. He created one of the first virtual high schools, working with Dr. Shelley Berman, then Principal of Hudson Schools in Massachusetts. He served as a co-founder and president of the Concord Consortium from 1994 to 2009.

== Early life and education ==
Robert Tinker, the youngest of a family of four children, was born on December 11, 1941, in Wilmington, Delaware to Janet Casto Tinker of Terre Haute, Indiana and John Marlin Tinker. His father, a chemist, directed the Jackson Laboratory at DuPont, and played a leading part in the production of sulphanilamide family of drugs and anthrimides to make inks, which had stopped being shipped from Germany during World War II.

His mother Janet died at his birth, and his father then married Adelaide Louise Camerano of Chicago, IL. As his brother, John Frank, and two sisters, Dorothy Jane and Irene Celeste, had left home, Robert grew up with much time for reading and exploration. He spent his childhood creating with train sets and erector sets, making explosives; and eating pastries during summer visits to grandparents who operated an Italian bakery in Chicago. Enjoying airplanes and flying with his pilot parents, he soloed as a pilot at the age of 16, and then flew long trips with his parents.

His family were members of the Society of Friends, attending Wilmington Meeting. For elementary and secondary school, he went to Wilmington Friends School, before going on to Swarthmore College. He later attended Mt. Toby Friends Meeting in Amherst, MA.

== Physics, education, and technology ==
At Swarthmore, Robert double majored in Physics and Chemistry and graduated with High Honors in 1963. There he met Barbara Ann Perkins, who was participating in student civil rights actions. They were married in the Swarthmore Friends Meeting in February 1964. Robert finished his graduate studies early from Stanford University with a master's degree and, with Barbara, headed South to teach at Stillman College, in Tuscaloosa, Alabama from 1964 to 1966. There they marched on a variety of occasions, including in Selma, and worked in voter registration efforts locally.

As the first faculty member in the Physics Department, Robert gained direct teaching experience and mentored several students who went onto graduate studies in the North. With his laboratory filled with springs and oscilloscopes, he sought more teaching tools by visiting army depots to collect surplus equipment.

Tinker founded a small enterprise called the Recruitment of Southern Teachers, Inc. in Tuscaloosa, Alabama, after receiving a grant from the Ford Foundation from 1964 to 1966 that enticed qualified teachers to spend time in Black colleges. After a summer as research assistant at the Los Alamos National Laboratory in 1965, while Barbara worked in a local pueblo CAP program, he returned to Stillman for an additional year, and Barbara completed her master's degree at Columbia and taught History of Religions at Stillman.

In 1966, Robert and Barbara returned to Cambridge, Massachusetts, where he did his doctoral work in experimental low-temperature physics at MIT and participated in Barbara's tutoring and community organizing efforts. His thesis work was under the direction of professor and physicist John G. King. While he did research at MIT, he accepted a part-time instructor job at Wellesley College, to cover the high cost of tuition and the arrival of his first son, Dylan C. Tinker in 1968. He earned his Ph.D. in 1970, writing a dissertation on superfluids and evaporation properties of Helium II films.

In 1971, he accepted a position as an assistant professor at Amherst College, Amherst, Massachusetts the same year his second son, Aaron BredinTinker, was born. While concurrently teaching physics, Robert took a freelance position as curriculum writer and consultant for the Technical Education Research Centers in Cambridge, Massachusetts. As a physicist who was also skilled at writing, he authored several grants that funded the Modular Electronics Project and the Computer and Laboratory Math Project in 1976 and became the Director of the Technology Center for TERC at its location on 8 Eliot St., Cambridge, Massachusetts. During his tenure, the organization grew from six staff to 100 full-time and successfully initiated a series of projects that marked TERC's transition from postsecondary technical education to K-12 science.

Committed to improving physics education for all, he spent three years (1975–78) concurrently as a lecturer delivering Chautauqua Courses for college teachers held at regional field centers, a program developed by the AAAS American Association for the Advancement of Science in 1971 funded by the National Science Foundation. The original idea behind Chautauqua was to present a series of short courses for instructors who teach at two- and four-year institutions in order to give them some new information about topics they found of interest and would teach others.

In the '80's, Robert Tinker developed the idea of equipping computers with sensors (probes for real-time measurements) and of using the network for collaborative student data sharing and investigations. Working with Marcia Linn at the University of California at Berkeley, Robert pioneered micro-based computer laboratories using probeware with Apple II computers in middle school science classrooms. While at TERC, as Project Director and then Chief Science Officer, he also enabled the design of the first National Geographic Kids network and the Global Laboratory Project, which enabled children to engage in citizen science, collecting and sharing local scientific data with each other and with scientists.

In 1994, Robert Tinker started the Concord Consortium in Concord, Massachusetts, so he could concentrate on applications of technology to improve the quality of education, such as web-based courses. His early work at Concord pioneered applications of portable computers to education and the use of the Web for inquiry-based professional development and teaching. One of these early projects created the first Virtual High School, which was spun out as an independent nonprofit that continues to be a trendsetter in online teaching.

Working with lead developer Dr. QIan Xie and others, He helped to develop molecular modeling software for use in education.

At the time of his death, his current research included educational applications of portable computers, the development and testing of computational models in education, and the development of “smart graphs” that are able to interact with students about important features of a graph. He was also involved in policy formation relating to educational technology and its role in improving STEM education worldwide.

Robert Tinker died on June 21, 2017.

== Awards ==
- Friday Medal, Friday Institute for Educational Innovation
- Smithsonian-Siemens Award for Best Applications of Technology in Education, 1990 HighBeam
