= Axion =

Hypothetical elementary particle

- Interactions: gravitational, electromagnetic, strong, weak
- Status: hypothetical
- Symbol: A^{0}, a, θ
- Theorized: 1978, Wilczek and Weinberg
- Mass: 10^{−7} to 1 eV/c^{2}
- Electric charge: 0 e
- Spin: 0 ħ

An axion (/ˈæksiɒn/) is a hypothetical elementary particle originally theorized in 1978 independently by Frank Wilczek and Steven Weinberg as the Goldstone boson of Peccei–Quinn theory, which had been proposed in 1977 to solve the strong CP problem in quantum chromodynamics (QCD). If axions exist and have low mass within a specific range, they are of interest as a possible component of cold dark matter.

== History ==
=== Strong CP problem ===
As shown by Gerard 't Hooft, strong interactions of the Standard Model, QCD, possess a non-trivial vacuum structure (Note: This non-trivial vacuum structure solves a problem associated to the U(1) axial symmetry of QCD.) that in principle permits violation of the combined symmetries of charge conjugation and parity, collectively known as CP. Together with effects generated by weak interactions, the effective periodic strong CP-violating term, Θ̅, appears as a Standard Model input – its value is not predicted by the theory, but must be measured. However, large CP-violating interactions originating from QCD would induce a large electric dipole moment (EDM) for the neutron. Experimental constraints on the EDM implies that CP violation from QCD must be extremely tiny and thus Θ̅ must itself be extremely small. Since Θ̅ could have any value between 0 and 2π, this presents a "naturalness" problem for the Standard Model. Why should this parameter find itself so close to zero? (Or, why should QCD find itself CP-preserving?) This question constitutes what is known as the strong CP problem. (Note: One simple solution to the strong CP problem exists: If at least one of the quarks of the Standard Model is massless, CP-violation becomes unobservable. However, empirical evidence strongly suggests that none of the quarks are massless. Consequently, particle theorists sought other resolutions to the problem of unexplained conserved CP.)

=== Prediction ===
In 1977, Roberto Peccei and Helen Quinn postulated a more elegant solution to the strong CP problem, the Peccei–Quinn mechanism. The idea is to effectively promote Θ̅ to a field. This is accomplished by adding a new global symmetry (called a Peccei–Quinn (PQ) symmetry) that becomes spontaneously broken. This results in a new particle, as shown independently by Frank Wilczek and Steven Weinberg, that fills the role of Θ̅, naturally relaxing the CP-violation parameter to zero. Wilczek named this new hypothesized particle the "axion" after a brand of laundry detergent because it carries the CP-violating "axial" current that "cleaned up" the problem, while Weinberg called it "the higglet". Weinberg later agreed to adopt Wilczek's name for the particle. Because it has a non-zero mass, the axion is a pseudo-Nambu–Goldstone boson.

== Axion dark matter ==
The number-line is broken into the two major classifications of dark matter particle hypotheses, particle-like dark matter (e.g. WIMPs) and wave-like dark matter (e.g. axions). The Compton wavelength and Compton frequency of the particles are shown for comparison, along with a few major reference points. Created in 2024 by Ciaran O'Hare.

QCD effects produce an effective periodic potential in which the axion field moves. Expanding the potential about one of its minima, one finds that the product of the axion mass with the axion decay constant is determined by the topological susceptibility of the QCD vacuum. An axion with mass much less than 60 keV/c^{2} is long-lived and weakly interacting, a perfect dark matter candidate.

The oscillations of the axion field about the minimum of the effective potential, the so-called misalignment mechanism, generate a cosmological population of cold axions with an abundance depending on the mass of the axion. With a mass above 5 μeV/c^{2} (10^{−11} times the electron mass) axions could account for dark matter, and thus be both a dark-matter candidate and a solution to the strong CP problem. If inflation occurs at a low scale and lasts sufficiently long, the axion mass can be as low as 1 peV/c^{2}.

There are two distinct scenarios in which the axion field begins its evolution, depending on the following two conditions:

(a)	The PQ symmetry is spontaneously broken during inflation. This condition is realized whenever the axion energy scale is larger than the Hubble rate at the end of inflation.
(b)	The PQ symmetry is never restored after its spontaneous breaking occurs. This condition is realized whenever the axion energy scale is larger than the maximum temperature reached in the post-inflationary Universe.

Broadly speaking, one of the two possible scenarios outlined in the two following subsections occurs:

=== Pre-inflationary scenario ===
If both (a) and (b) are satisfied, cosmic inflation selects one patch of the Universe within which the spontaneous breaking of the PQ symmetry leads to a homogeneous value of the initial value of the axion field. In this "pre-inflationary" scenario, topological defects are inflated away and do not contribute to the axion energy density. However, other bounds that come from isocurvature modes severely constrain this scenario, which require a relatively low-energy scale of inflation to be viable.

=== Post-inflationary scenario ===
If at least one of the conditions (a) or (b) is violated, the axion field takes different values within patches that are initially out of causal contact, but that today populate the volume enclosed by our Hubble horizon. In this scenario, isocurvature fluctuations in the PQ field randomise the axion field, with no preferred value in the power spectrum.

The proper treatment in this scenario is to solve numerically the equation of motion of the PQ field in an expanding Universe, in order to capture all features coming from the misalignment mechanism, including the contribution from topological defects like "axionic" strings and domain walls. An axion mass estimate between 0.05 and 1.50 meV/c^{2} was reported by Borsanyi et al. (2016). The result was calculated by simulating the formation of axions during the post-inflation period on a supercomputer.

Progress in the late 2010s in determining the present abundance of a KSVZ-type axion (Note: At present, physics literature discusses "invisible axion" mechanisms in two forms, one of them is called KSVZ for Kim–Shifman–Vainshtein–Zakharov. See discussion in the "Searches" section, below.) using numerical simulations lead to values between 0.02 and 0.1 meV/c^{2}, although these results have been challenged by the details on the power spectrum of emitted axions from strings.

== Phenomenology of the axion field ==
=== Searches ===
The axion models originally proposed by Wilczek and by Weinberg chose axion coupling strengths that were so strong that they would have already been detected in prior experiments. It had been thought that the Peccei–Quinn mechanism for solving the strong CP problem required such large couplings. However, it was soon realized that "invisible axions" with much smaller couplings also work. Two such classes of models are known in the literature as KSVZ (Kim–Shifman–Vainshtein–Zakharov) and DFSZ (Dine–Fischler–Srednicki–Zhitnitsky).}}

The very weakly coupled axion is also very light, because axion couplings and mass are proportional. Satisfaction with "invisible axions" changed when it was shown that any very light axion would have been overproduced in the early universe and therefore must be excluded.

=== Maxwell's equations with axion modifications ===
Pierre Sikivie computed how Maxwell's equations are modified in the presence of an axion in 1983. He showed that these axions could be detected on Earth by using a strong magnetic field to convert them into photons, which motivated a number of experiments. For example, the Axion Dark Matter Experiment attempts to convert axion dark matter to microwave photons, the CERN Axion Solar Telescope attempt to convert axions that are produced in the Sun's core to X-rays, and other experiments search for axions produced in laser light. As of the early 2020s, there are dozens of proposed or ongoing experiments searching for axion dark matter.

Treating the reduced Planck constant $\hbar$, speed of light $c$, and permittivity of free space $\varepsilon_0$ all equivalent to 1, the electrodynamic equations are:

Name	Equations
Gauss's law	$\nabla \cdot \mathbf{E} = \rho - g_{a\gamma\gamma} \mathbf{B} \cdot \nabla a$
Gauss's law for magnetism	$\nabla \cdot \mathbf{B} = 0$
Faraday's law	$\nabla \times \mathbf{E} = - \dot{ \mathbf{B} }$
Ampère–Maxwell law	$\quad \nabla \times \mathbf{B} = \dot{\mathbf{E}} + \mathbf{J} + g_{a\gamma\gamma} \left( \dot{a} \mathbf{B} - \mathbf{E} \times \nabla a \right) \quad$
Axion field's equation of motion	$\ddot{a} - \nabla^2 a + m_a^2 a = -g_{a\gamma\gamma} \mathbf{E} \cdot \mathbf{B}$

Above, a dot above a variable denotes its time derivative; the dot spaced between variables is the vector dot product; the factor $g_{a\gamma\gamma}$ is the axion-to-photon coupling constant.

Alternative forms of these equations have been proposed, which imply completely different physical signatures. For example, Visinelli wrote a set of equations that imposed duality symmetry, assuming the existence of magnetic monopoles. However, these alternative formulations are less theoretically motivated, and in many cases cannot even be derived from an action.

=== Analogous effect for topological insulators ===
A term analogous to the one that would be added to Maxwell's equations to account for axions also appears in recent (2008) theoretical models for topological insulators giving an effective axion description of the electrodynamics of these materials.

This term leads to several interesting predicted properties including a quantized magnetoelectric effect. Evidence for this effect has been given in THz spectroscopy experiments performed at the Johns Hopkins University on quantum regime thin film topological insulators developed at Rutgers University.

In 2019, a team at the Max Planck Institute for Chemical Physics of Solids published their detection of an axion insulator phase of a Weyl semimetal material. In the axion insulator phase, the material has an axion-like quasiparticle – an excitation of electrons that behave together as an axion – and its discovery demonstrates the consistency of axion electrodynamics as a description of the interaction of axion-like particles with electromagnetic fields. In this way, the discovery of axion-like quasiparticles in axion insulators provides motivation to use axion electrodynamics to search for the axion itself.

Constraints on the axion's coupling to the photon

== Experiments ==
Despite not having been found to date, the axion has been well studied for over 40 years, giving time for physicists to develop insight into axion effects that might be detected. Several experimental searches for axions are presently underway; most exploit axions' expected slight interaction with photons in strong magnetic fields. Axions are also one of the few remaining plausible candidates for dark matter particles, and might be discovered in some dark matter experiments.

Most searches for the axions probe the axion-photon coupling via the Primakoff effect, the conversion between axions and photons in the presence of magnetic fields.

=== Laboratory experiments ===
==== Helioscopes ====
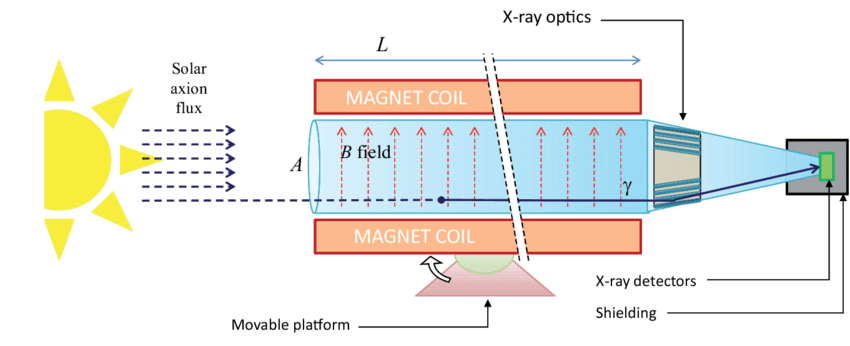
Principle of operation of IAXO/BabyIAXO helioscope

Axion helioscopes search for axions produced by the Sun. A large magnet is used to convert solar axions into x-ray photons. Axions produced in the Sun might have an energy range of 1–10 keV and can therefore be converted into x-rays of the same energy in the magnet. An early dedicated axion helioscope was the Tokyo Axion Helioscope (SUMICO) at the University of Tokyo, a second-generation experiment following an earlier helioscope search at Brookhaven National Laboratory. SUMICO used a 4 T, 2.3 m superconducting magnet with active solar tracking, and later introduced helium buffer gas to extend its sensitivity to higher axion masses. In 2024, the CERN Axion Solar Telescope (CAST) reached the axion–photon coupling limit of 5.8×10^{−11} GeV^{−1} at 95% CL (for $m_a$ ≲ 0.02 eV) in 2024. The next-generation helioscope is the International AXion Observatory (IAXO), which is currently in development.

==== Light-shining-through-walls ====
Another technique is so called "light shining through walls", where light passes through an intense magnetic field to convert photons into axions, which then pass through metal and are reconstituted as photons by another magnetic field on the other side of the barrier. Experiments by BFRS and a team led by Rizzo ruled out an axion cause. GammeV saw no events, reported in a 2008 Physics Review Letter. ALPS I conducted similar runs, setting new constraints in 2010; ALPS II began collecting data in May 2023. OSQAR found no signal, limiting coupling, and will continue.

==== Haloscopes ====
Unlike the previous two approaches, axion haloscopes directly search for dark matter axions in the Milky Way dark matter halo. The Axion Dark Matter Experiment (ADMX) at the University of Washington is a haloscope that uses a strong magnetic field to weakly convert axions to microwaves. These microwave photons are then detected in a resonant cavity. ADMX has excluded optimistic axion models in the range 1.9–3.53 μeV/c^{2}. From 2013 to 2018 a series of upgrades were done and it is taking new data, including at 4.9–6.2 μeV/c^{2}. In December 2021 it excluded the range 3.3–4.2 μeV/c^{2} for the KSVZ model.

Many other experiments use a wide variety of techniques to detect halo axions, including DMRadio, HAYSTAC, CULTASK, and ORGAN. HAYSTAC completed the first scanning run of a haloscope above 20 μeV/c^{2} in the late 2010s. ORGAN plans to search for axions through resonance effects in Josephson junctions.

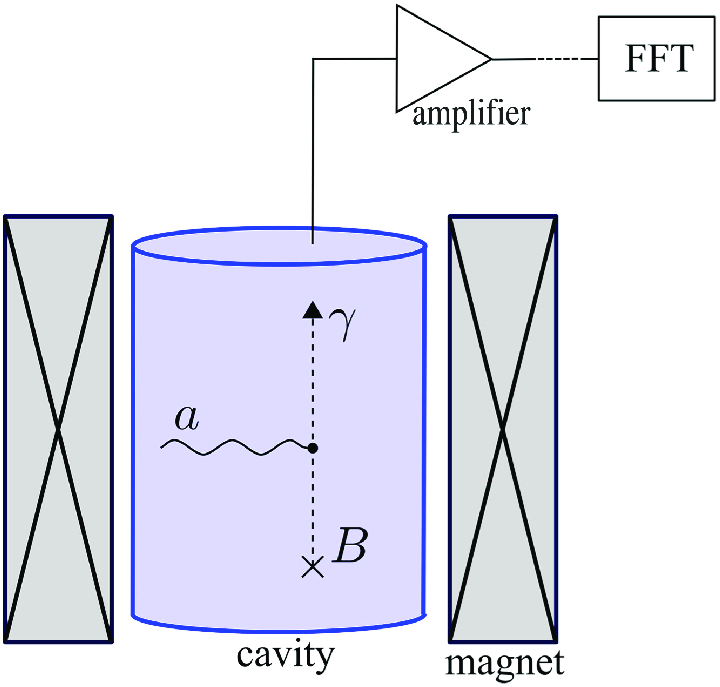
Haloscope concept of a resonance cavity

==== Polarized light in a magnetic field ====
The Italian PVLAS experiment searches for polarization changes of light propagating in a magnetic field. The concept was first put forward in 1986 by Luciano Maiani, Roberto Petronzio and Emilio Zavattini. A rotation claim in 2006 was excluded by an upgraded setup. An optimized search began in 2014.

=== Astrophysical axion searches ===
Axion-like bosons could have a signature in astrophysical settings. In particular, several works have proposed axion-like particles as a solution to the apparent transparency of the Universe to TeV photons (very-high-energy gamma rays). It has also been demonstrated that, in the large magnetic fields threading the atmospheres of compact astrophysical objects (e.g., magnetars), photons will convert much more efficiently. This would in turn give rise to distinct absorption-like features in the spectra detectable by early 21st century telescopes. A new (2009) promising means is looking for quasi-particle refraction in systems with strong magnetic gradients. In particular, the refraction will lead to beam splitting in the radio light curves of highly magnetized pulsars and allow much greater sensitivities than currently achievable.

Axions can resonantly convert into photons in the magnetospheres of neutron stars. The emerging photons lie in the GHz frequency range and can be potentially picked up in radio detectors, leading to a sensitive probe of the axion parameter space. This strategy has been used to constrain the axion–photon coupling in the mass range 5–11 μeV/c^{2}, by re-analyzing existing data from the Green Bank Telescope and the Effelsberg 100 m Radio Telescope. A novel, alternative strategy consists of detecting the transient signal from the encounter between a neutron star and an axion minicluster in the Milky Way.

Axions may also be produced within neutron stars by nucleon–nucleon bremsstrahlung. The subsequent decay of axions to gamma rays allows constraints on the axion mass to be placed from observations of neutron stars in gamma-rays using the Fermi Gamma-ray Space Telescope. From an analysis of four neutron stars, Berenji et al. (2016) obtained a 95% confidence interval upper limit on the axion mass of 0.079 eV/c^{2}. In 2021 it has been also suggested that a reported excess of hard X-ray emission from a system of neutron stars known as the magnificent seven could be explained as axion emission.

In 2016, a theoretical team from Massachusetts Institute of Technology devised a possible way of detecting axions using a strong magnetic field that need be no stronger than that produced in an MRI scanning machine. It would show variation, a slight wavering, that is linked to the mass of the axion. Results from the ensuing experiment published in 2021 reported no evidence of axions in the mass range from 4.1×10^{−10} eV/c^{2} to 8.27×10^{−9} eV/c^{2}.

In 2022 the polarized light measurements of Messier 87* by the Event Horizon Telescope were used to constrain the mass of the axion assuming that hypothetical clouds of axions could form around a black hole, rejecting the approximate 10^{−21} eV/c^{2} – 10^{−20} eV/c^{2} range of mass values.

Cosmological measurements can also place constraints on axions. For example, cosmic microwave background (CMB) photons can convert to axions in the magnetic field of galaxy clusters. Such a "screening" effect would show up as spectral distortions of the CMB in locations with galaxy clusters.

=== Other searches ===
Constraints on the axion's dimensionless coupling to electrons

==== Dark matter recoil searches ====
Dark matter cryogenic detectors have searched for electron recoils that would indicate axions. CDMS published in 2009 and EDELWEISS set coupling and mass limits in 2013. UORE and XMASS also set limits on solar axions in 2013. XENON100 used a 225-day run to set the best coupling limits to date and exclude some parameters.

==== Nuclear spin precession ====
While Schiff's theorem states that a static nuclear electric dipole moment (EDM) does not produce atomic and molecular EDMs, the axion induces an oscillating nuclear EDM that oscillates at the Larmor frequency. If this nuclear EDM oscillation frequency is in resonance with an external electric field, a precession in the nuclear spin rotation occurs. This precession can be measured using precession magnetometry and if detected, would be evidence for axions.

An experiment using this technique is the Cosmic Axion Spin Precession Experiment (CASPEr).

==== Searches at particle colliders ====
Axions may also be produced at colliders, in particular in electron-positron collisions as well as in ultra-peripheral heavy ion collisions at the Large Hadron Collider at CERN, reinterpreting the light-by-light scattering process. Those searches are sensitive for rather large axion masses between 100 MeV/c^{2} and hundreds of GeV/c^{2}. Assuming a coupling of axions to the Higgs boson, searches for anomalous Higgs boson decays into two axions can theoretically provide even stronger limits.

== Disputed detections ==
It was reported in 2014 that evidence for axions may have been detected as a seasonal variation in observed X-ray emission that would be expected from conversion in the Earth's magnetic field of axions streaming from the Sun. Studying 15 years of data by the European Space Agency's XMM-Newton observatory, a research group at Leicester University noticed a seasonal variation for which no conventional explanation could be found. One potential explanation for the variation, described as "plausible" by the senior author of the paper, is the known seasonal variation in visibility to XMM-Newton of the sunward magnetosphere in which X-rays may be produced by axions from the Sun's core.

This interpretation of the seasonal variation is disputed by two Italian researchers, who identify flaws in the arguments of the Leicester group that are said to rule out an interpretation in terms of axions. Most importantly, the scattering in angle assumed by the Leicester group to be caused by magnetic field gradients during the photon production, necessary to allow the X-rays to enter the detector that cannot point directly at the sun, would dissipate the flux so much that the probability of detection would be negligible.

In 2013, Christian Beck suggested that axions might be detectable in Josephson junctions; and in 2014, he argued that a signature, consistent with a mass ≈ 110 μeV, had in fact been observed in several preexisting experiments.

In 2020, the XENON1T experiment at the Gran Sasso National Laboratory in Italy reported a result suggesting the discovery of solar axions. The results were not significant at the 5-sigma level required for confirmation, and other explanations of the data were possible though less likely. New observations made in July 2022 after the observatory upgrade to XENONnT discarded the excess, thus ending the possibility of new particle discovery.

== Properties ==
=== Predictions ===
One theory of axions relevant to cosmology had predicted that they would have no electric charge, a very small mass in the range from 1 μeV/c^{2} to 1 eV/c^{2}, and very low interaction cross-sections for strong and weak forces. Because of their properties, axions would interact only minimally with ordinary matter. Axions would also change to and from photons in magnetic fields.

=== Cosmological implications ===
The properties of the axion, such as the axion mass, decay constant, and abundance, all have implications for cosmology.

Inflation theory suggests that if they exist, axions would be created abundantly during the Big Bang. Because of a unique coupling to the instanton field of the primordial universe (the "misalignment mechanism"), an effective dynamical friction is created during the acquisition of mass, following cosmic inflation. This robs all such primordial axions of their kinetic energy.

An ultralight axion (ULA) with m ~ 10^{−22} eV/c^{2} is a kind of scalar field dark matter that seems to solve the small scale problems of CDM. A single ULA with a GUT scale decay constant provides the correct relic density without fine-tuning.

Axions would also have stopped interaction with normal matter at a different moment after the Big Bang than other more massive dark particles. The lingering effects of this difference could perhaps be calculated and observed astronomically.

If axions have low mass, thus preventing other decay modes (since there are no lighter particles to decay into), the low coupling constant thus predicts that the axion is not scattered out of its state despite its small mass so that the universe would be filled with a very cold Bose–Einstein condensate of primordial axions. Hence, axions could plausibly explain the dark matter problem of physical cosmology. Observational studies are underway, but they are not yet sufficiently sensitive to probe the mass regions if they are the solution to the dark matter problem with the fuzzy dark matter region starting to be probed via superradiance. High mass axions of the kind searched for by Jain and Singh (2007) would not persist in the modern universe. Moreover, if axions exist, scatterings with other particles in the thermal bath of the early universe unavoidably produce a population of hot axions.

Low mass axions could have additional structure at the galactic scale. If they continuously fall into galaxies from the intergalactic medium, they would be denser in "caustic" rings, just as the stream of water in a continuously flowing fountain is thicker at its peak. The gravitational effects of these rings on galactic structure and rotation might then be observable. Other cold dark matter theoretical candidates, such as WIMPs and MACHOs, could also form such rings, but because such candidates are fermionic and thus experience friction or scattering among themselves, the rings would be less sharply defined.

João G. Rosa and Thomas W. Kephart suggested that axion clouds formed around unstable primordial black holes might initiate a chain of reactions that radiate electromagnetic waves, allowing their detection. When adjusting the mass of the axions to explain dark matter, the pair discovered that the value would also explain the luminosity and wavelength of fast radio bursts, being a possible origin for both phenomena. In 2022 a similar hypothesis was used to constrain the mass of the axion from data of M87*.

In 2020, it was proposed that the axion field might actually have influenced the evolution of the early Universe by creating more imbalance between the amounts of matter and antimatter – which possibly resolves the baryon asymmetry problem.

=== Supersymmetry ===
In supersymmetric theories the axion has both a scalar and a fermionic superpartner. The fermionic superpartner of the axion is called the axino, the scalar superpartner is called the saxion or dilaton. They are all bundled in a chiral superfield.

The axino has been predicted to be the lightest supersymmetric particle in such a model. In part due to this property, it is also considered a candidate for dark matter.

== See also ==
- Dark photon
- Chameleon particle, a dark energy candidate that can also be converted by a magnetic field
- List of hypothetical particles
- Weakly interacting slender particle

== Sources ==
- Peccei, R. D.; Quinn, H. R. (1977). "CP conservation in the presence of pseudoparticles". Physical Review Letters. 38 (25): 1440–1443. Bibcode:1977PhRvL..38.1440P. doi:10.1103/PhysRevLett.38.1440. S2CID 9518918.
- Peccei, R. D.; Quinn, H. R. (1977). "Constraints imposed by CP conservation in the presence of pseudoparticles". Physical Review D. 16 (6): 1791–1797. Bibcode:1977PhRvD..16.1791P. doi:10.1103/PhysRevD.16.1791.
- Weinberg, Steven (1978). "A new light boson?". Physical Review Letters. 40 (4): 223–226. Bibcode:1978PhRvL..40..223W. doi:10.1103/PhysRevLett.40.223. S2CID 610538.
- Wilczek, Frank (1978). "Problem of strong P and T invariance in the presence of instantons". Physical Review Letters. 40 (5): 279–282. Bibcode:1978PhRvL..40..279W. doi:10.1103/PhysRevLett.40.279.
