= Axion (brand) =

Washing-up liquid (UK), dishwashing liquid (US)

- Product type: Dishwashing liquid
- Current owner: Colgate-Palmolive
- Introduced: 1968; 58 years ago (first introduction); 1996; 30 years ago (India)
- Markets: Asia and Latin America
- Website: Official website

Axion is an American brand of dishwashing liquid product marketed by Colgate-Palmolive. It is available in Asia and Latin America.

== History ==
Originally, Colgate's Axion brand was the name of an enzyme pre-soak, to be used before laundering clothes. It was introduced on March 18, 1968.

== See also ==
- Palmolive - a similar dishwashing liquid produced by C-P for the U.S., Canada and other markets.
- Axion - a hypothetical fundamental particle whose name was inspired by the detergent.
