= Emilio Zavattini =

Italian physicist

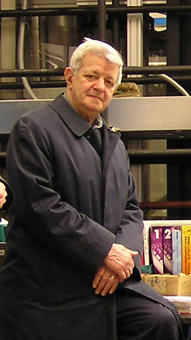
Portrait of Emilio Zavattini.

Emilio Zavattini (March 14, 1927 – January 9, 2007) was an Italian particle physicist.

== Biography ==
He was born in Rimini, Italy and enrolled in the University of Rome La Sapienza as a physics student in 1950 and earned his doctorate in 1954.

Zavattini joined CERN in 1955 and remained a staff member until he retired in 1992. Early in this period he made a short post-doctoral visit to Nevis Laboratory at Columbia University where he worked with Leon Lederman. After retirement, he held a position as a professor at the University of Trieste from 1988–1999.

Zavattini is known for the muon g-2 experiment and the PVLAS experiment at the INFN Laboratory in Legnaro (Padua, Italy). He made contributions within the fields of strong, weak and electromagnetic interactions—especially using muons—both at CERN and at other European and U.S. laboratories. In later years his studies focused on a better understanding of the structure of vacuum.

He was a member of the Accademia dei Lincei.

Zavattini died at the age of 79 of a heart attack.
