= PVLAS =

PVLAS (Polarizzazione del Vuoto con LASer, "polarization of the vacuum with laser") aims to carry out a test of quantum electrodynamics and possibly detect dark matter at the Department of Physics and National Institute of Nuclear Physics in Ferrara, Italy. It searches for vacuum polarization causing nonlinear optical behavior in magnetic fields. Experiments began in 2001 at the INFN Laboratory in Legnaro (Padua, Italy) and continue today with new equipment.

== Background ==
Nonlinear electrodynamic effects in vacuum have been predicted since the earliest days of quantum electrodynamics (QED), a few years after the discovery of positrons. One such effect is vacuum magnetic birefringence, closely connected to elastic light-by-light interaction. The effect is extremely small and has never yet been observed directly. Although today QED is a very well-tested theory, the importance of detecting light-by-light interaction remains. First, QED has always been tested in the presence of charged particles either in the initial state or the final state. No tests exist in systems with only photons. More generally, no interaction has ever been observed directly with only gauge bosons present in the initial and final states. Second, to date, the evidence for zero-point quantum fluctuations relies entirely on the observation of the Casimir effect, which applies to photons only. PVLAS deals with the fluctuations of virtual charged particle-antiparticle pairs (of any nature, including hypothetical millicharged particles) and therefore the structure of fermionic quantum vacuum: to leading order, it would be a direct detection of loop diagrams. Finally, the observation of light-by-light interaction would be an evidence of the breakdown of the superposition principle and of Maxwell's equations. One important consequence of a nonlinearity is that the velocity of light would depend on the presence or not of other electromagnetic fields. PVLAS carries out its search by looking at changes in the polarisation state of a linearly polarised laser beam after it passes through a vacuum with an intense magnetic field. The birefringence of the vacuum in quantum electrodynamics by an external field is generally credited to Stephen L. Adler, who presented the first general derivation in Photon splitting and photon dispersion in a strong magnetic field in 1971. Experimental investigation of the photon splitting in atomic field was carried out at the ROKK-1 facility at the Budker institute in 1993-96.

== Design ==
PVLAS uses a high-finesse Fabry-Perot optical cavity. The first setup, used until 2005, sent a linearly polarized laser beam through vacuum with 5T magnetic field from a superconducting magnet to an ellipsometer. After upgrades to avoid fringe fields, several runs were done at 2.3T and 5T, excluding a prior claim of axion detection. It was determined that an optimized optical setup was needed for discovery potential. A prototype with much improved sensitivity was tested in 2010. In 2013 the upgraded apparatus at INFN Ferrara with permanent magnets and horizontal ellipsometer was set up and began data taking in 2014

== Results ==
PVLAS investigated vacuum polarization induced by external magnetic fields. An observation of the rotation of light polarization by the vacuum in a magnetic field was published in 2006. Data taken with an upgraded setup excluded the previous magnetic rotation in 2008 and set limits on photon-photon scattering. An improved limit on nonlinear vacuum effects was set in 2012: A_{e} < 2.9·10^{−21} T^{−2} @ 95% C.L.

== See also ==
- DAMA/NaI
- DAMA/LIBRA
- CAST
