= Cumulative learning =

Cognitive process

Cumulative learning is the cognitive process by which we accumulate and improve knowledge and abilities that serve as building blocks for subsequent cognitive development. A primary benefit of such is that it consolidates knowledge one has obtained through experience, and allows the facilitation of further learning through analogical knowledge transfer. This is seen through students' ability to transfer knowledge across contexts and through time.

It is a concept that has been widely written about in psychological literature, with scholars particularly drawing attention to the fact it allows for the incremental increase in scope of ability and knowledge., without damaging pre-existing skills. More meaningfully constructed knowledge can be better reserved for future use.

This theory serves as an alternative approach to maturational theories such as the model proposed by Jean Piaget concerning intellectual and learning development.

== Theory ==
American psychologist Robert M. Gagne first introduced the concept of cumulative learning in 1968 on the basis that intellectual skills can be broken down into simpler ones. His model proposed that new learning builds upon prior learning and is dependent on the combination of previously acquired knowledge. Gagné believed that learning is cumulative and human intellectual development consists of building up increasingly complex interacting structures of learned capabilities.

Gagné's theory was explored by Bruner, who argued that as children grow, the curriculum should repeatedly present learned information and expand on it until the child understands the information and its relations more completely. In a later explanation, Gagne stated that "there is a specifiable minimal prerequisite for each new learning task," and that if the learner cannot recall this capability, learning a new task is not possible.

The core assumption underlying the concept is that the learning of humans is cumulative by nature, so learned knowledge is consolidated and reproduced for further learning situations. There are four types of knowledge constructed in cumulative learning: abstract, concrete, general and specific. Abstract knowledge reduces the amount of detailed information in the cognitive structure, with concrete generating additional details about the entities of information in such a place. General and specific knowledge are the opposites of each other; the former extends the reference set of information, and the latter narrows it.

According to Gagne, the cumulative learning theory is better than the maturational model because of the focus on the hierarchies of capabilities. In this framework, instead of the content and concepts of the task, the learning hierarchies address intellectual skills and strategies. He demonstrated this in the case of children's performance on conservation tasks over time.

== Development ==
Since the concept of cumulative learning was first written about by Gagné, there have been great advances in the understanding of it. Cumulative learning is a hallmark of human cognition, offering an integrated view of processes that have been previously treated in isolation. At the heart of it is unification - new information is integrated by default with already acquired knowledge. There are 14 dimensions which determine the performance characteristics of cumulative learning implementation, separated into three groupings: memory management, temporal capacity and granularity, and generality. Each of these areas help to identify just how cumulative learning works in practice. An ideal cumulative learner should be capable of learning multiple things consecutively, accumulating knowledge in any situation and being able to use it in unforeseen future contexts.

Other works have noted that cumulative learning allows a learner to acquire knowledge through four processes: activating existing schema relevant for new information, concretely generalising the given information, extracting commonalities and reorganising the information in the cognitive structure accordingly. Whilst they appear to differ slightly from the ones mentioned above, they are referring to the same processes in principle. Once they have acquired new information, learners try to incorporate it into their existing knowledge structures with these new cognitive structures - then interact cumulatively with further learning situations.

A further two cognitive processes are identified as being inherent to cumulative learning - aggregation and abstraction. Aggregation is where a learner extracts and identifies information into a coherent knowledge structure, and abstraction is the process of extracting commonalities from the underlying structure of knowledge and created mental models. Learners can also use a combination of both to assist their knowledge retention and utilisation.

== Application ==
The concept of cumulative learning can, and has been, applied to real-world situations. A very simple example is the saying 'you can't run before you can walk'; the procedural memory built while learning to walk is necessary before one can start to learn to run. Pronouncing words is impossible without first learning to pronounce the vowels and consonants that make them up (hence babies' babbling). This is an essential cognitive capacity, allowing prior development to produce new foundations for further cognitive development.

There is plenty of literature surrounding the use of cumulative learning in artificial intelligence and machine learning. Artificially general intelligent systems use cumulative learning, as they need to handle unknown dynamic environments where information isn't known upfront - precisely as described in the principle of cumulative learning. With regard to machine learning, information is compared and put into a framework for use with future processes or problem-solving tasks. Mechanisms in learning that can result in the development of knowledge and skills are cumulative and structural in nature.

Arguably, all learning is cumulative learning, as all learning depends on previous learning. Cumulative learning consolidates the knowledge one has obtained through experiences, allowing it to be reproduced and exploited for subsequent learning situations through cumulative interaction between prior knowledge and new information.

On a similar note, cumulative cultural learning is the idea that children inherit group-specific knowledge from the cultural ecologies they inhabit. Children construct new knowledge by updating and revising previous beliefs, learning through observations, participation and imitation. It shows how the principle of cumulative learning can be applied to situations from an early age, and is present in all learning opportunities throughout a person's lifetime. This type of cumulative learning is also reflected in the policy rhetoric - there is a continuous building of knowledge, addition of new skills and new meanings given to existing abilities.; something which is required for the development of new policies.

Experiments are deemed valuable because they promote cumulative learning - the replication and extension of experimental designs are the most reliable route to it. They provide learning opportunities as if a test doesn't go as planned, a researcher can use the information gained to adapt the methods used in the next experiment. However, relying on the naturally occurring replication of experimental research may not suffice to promote cumulative learning because interventions and outcomes measures are different across disparate contexts.

== Criticism ==
A criticism cites that cumulative learning theory is inadequate as a general theory of mental development because it is not sufficiently developed in such a way that it permits empirical tests of it. Whilst this may be true, it is clear that the concept itself is prevalent in cognitive development - as illustrated through the ways children learn and use new knowledge to inform future situations.
