= Fine-tuning (physics) =

Adjustment of parameters to fit data in theoretical physics

In theoretical physics, fine-tuning is the process in which parameters of a model must be adjusted very precisely in order to fit with certain observations.

Theories requiring fine-tuning are regarded as problematic in the absence of a known mechanism to explain why the parameters happen to have precisely the observed values that they return. The heuristic rule that parameters in a fundamental physical theory should not be too fine-tuned is called naturalness.

== Background ==
The idea that naturalness will explain fine tuning was brought into question by Nima Arkani-Hamed, a theoretical physicist, in his talk "Why is there a Macroscopic Universe?", a lecture from the mini-series "Multiverse & Fine Tuning" from the "Philosophy of Cosmology" project, a University of Oxford and Cambridge Collaboration 2013. In it he describes how naturalness has usually provided a solution to problems in physics; and that it had usually done so earlier than expected. However, in addressing the problem of the cosmological constant, naturalness has failed to provide an explanation though it would have been expected to have done so a long time ago.

The necessity of fine-tuning leads to various problems that do not show that the theories are incorrect, in the sense of falsifying observations, but nevertheless suggest that a piece of the story is missing. For example, the cosmological constant problem (why is the cosmological constant so small?); the hierarchy problem; and the strong CP problem, among others.

== Example ==
An example of a fine-tuning problem considered by the scientific community to have a plausible "natural" solution is the cosmological flatness problem, which is solved if inflationary theory is correct: inflation forces the universe to become very flat, answering the question of why the universe is today observed to be flat to such a high degree.

== Measurement ==
Although fine-tuning was traditionally measured by ad hoc fine-tuning measures, such as the Barbieri-Giudice-Ellis measure, over the past decade many scientists recognized that fine-tuning arguments were a specific application of Bayesian statistics.

== See also ==
- Anthropic principle
- Fine-tuned universe
- Hierarchy problem
- Strong CP problem
