= Pierre Sikivie =

American theoretical physicist (born 1949)

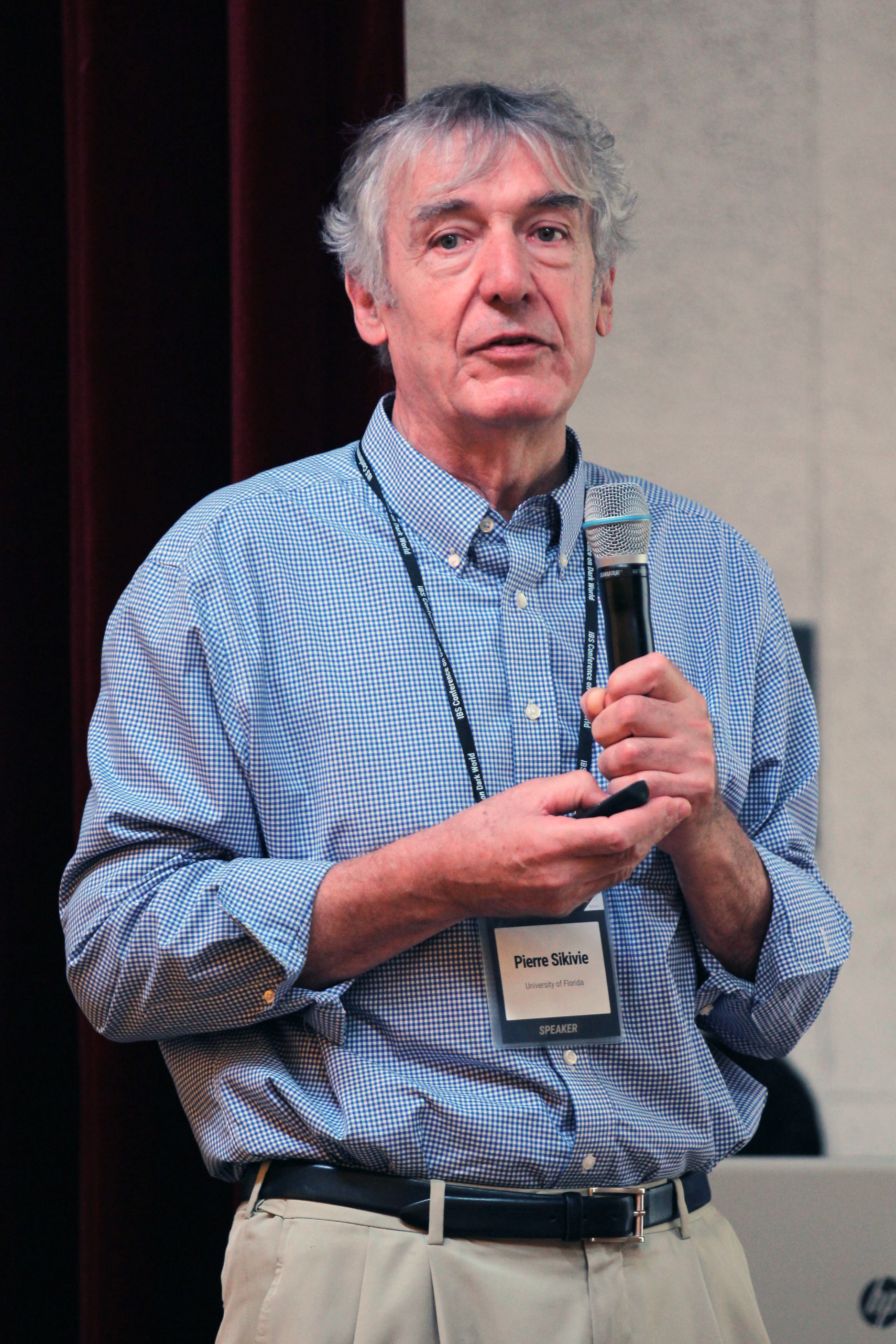
- Born: October 29, 1949 (age 77); Sint-Truiden, Belgium
- Education: Yale University
- Known for: Axion Cosmology, Axion Dark Matter Experiments
- Awards: Sakurai Prize (2020)
- Scientific career
- Fields: Physics
- Workplaces: University of Florida
- Thesis: Lepton and Hadron Spectra in Universal Gauge Theories (1975)
- Doctoral advisor: Feza Gürsey

Pierre Sikivie (born 29 October 1949) is an American theoretical physicist and currently the Distinguished Professor of Physics at University of Florida in Gainesville, Florida. He invented the axion haloscope and the axion helioscope and has played an important role in the development of axion cosmology.

== Academic career ==
Sikivie completed his Licencie en Sciences from University of Liège, Belgium in 1970 and completed his Ph.D. in Physics under Feza Gürsey from Yale University in 1975 with thesis Lepton and Hadron Spectra in Universal Gauge Theories. He was a research associate at Dept. of Phys., Univ. of Maryland from 1975 to 1977 and at SLAC from 1977 to 1979. He became Senior Fellow at CERN from 1979 to 1981 and assistant professor at University of Florida from 1981 to 1984. He became an associate professor of physics at University of Florida in 1984, and promoted to professor in 1988. He received his present title of "Distinguished Professor" in 2012. He is the 2020 recipient of the Sakurai Prize and the 2025 recipient of the Galileo Galilei Medal.

In 1994 Sikivie was elected a Fellow of the American Physical Society. He was a Guggenheim Fellow for the academic year 1997–1998. In 2026 he was elected to National Academy of Sciences.

== Dark matter axion physics ==
Sikivie played a crucial role in the development of the Axion Dark Matter eXperiment (ADMX). He collaborated with his colleagues, Neil S. Sullivan and David B. Tanner, at University of Florida and developed the experimental details of ADMX. In 1983, Sikivie, along with J. Preskill, M. B. Wise, F. Wilczek, L. F. Abbott, M. Dine, and W. Fischler, discovered that cosmic axions created from mis-alignment mechanism can be a substantial fraction of Dark Matter. Later Sikivie laid the theoretical ground for dark matter axion detections such as the ADMX.

== See also ==
- Axion
- Dark Matter
- ADMX
- IAXO
