= Peccei–Quinn theory =

Now-discarded theory in particle physics

In particle physics, the Peccei–Quinn theory is a well-known, long-standing proposal for the resolution of the strong CP problem formulated by Roberto Peccei and Helen Quinn in 1977. The theory introduces a new anomalous symmetry to the Standard Model along with a new scalar field which spontaneously breaks the symmetry at low energies, giving rise to an axion that suppresses the problematic CP violation. This model has long since been ruled out by experiments and has instead been replaced by similar invisible axion models which utilize the same mechanism to solve the strong CP problem.

== Overview ==
Quantum chromodynamics (QCD) has a complicated vacuum structure which gives rise to a CP violating θ-term in the Lagrangian. Such a term can have a number of non-perturbative effects, one of which is to give the neutron an electric dipole moment. The absence of this dipole moment in experiments requires the fine-tuning of the θ-term to be very small, something known as the strong CP problem. Motivated as a solution to this problem, Peccei–Quinn (PQ) theory introduces a new complex scalar field $\varphi$ in addition to the standard Higgs doublet. This scalar field couples to d-type quarks through Yukawa terms, while the Higgs now only couples to the up-type quarks. Additionally, a new global chiral anomalous U(1) symmetry is introduced, the Peccei–Quinn symmetry, under which $\varphi$ is charged, requiring some of the fermions also have a PQ charge. The scalar field also has a potential

$$V(\varphi) = \mu^2\bigg(|\varphi|^2 - \frac{f^2_a}{2}\bigg)^2,$$

where $\mu$ is a dimensionless parameter and $f_a$ is known as the decay constant. The potential results in $\varphi$ having the vacuum expectation value of $\langle \varphi \rangle = f_a/\sqrt 2$ at the electroweak phase transition.

Spontaneous symmetry breaking of the Peccei–Quinn symmetry below the electroweak scale gives rise to a pseudo-Goldstone boson known as the axion $a$, with the resulting Lagrangian taking the form

$$\mathcal L_{\text{tot}} = \mathcal L_{\text{SM,axions}} + \theta \frac{g_s^2}{32\pi^2}\tilde G^{\mu \nu}_b G_{b\mu \nu} +\xi \frac{a}{f_a}\frac{g_s^2}{32\pi^2}\tilde G^{\mu \nu}_b G_{b\mu \nu},$$

where the first term is the Standard Model (SM) and axion Lagrangian which includes axion–fermion interactions arising from the Yukawa terms. The second term is the CP violating θ-term, with $g_s$ the strong coupling constant, $G_{b\mu \nu}$ the gluon field strength tensor, and $\tilde G_{b\mu \nu}$ the dual field strength tensor. The third term is known as the color anomaly, a consequence of the Peccei–Quinn symmetry being anomalous, with $\xi$ determined by the choice of PQ charges for the quarks. If the symmetry is also anomalous in the electromagnetic sector, there will additionally be an anomaly term coupling the axion to photons. Due to the presence of the color anomaly, the effective $\theta$ angle is modified to $\theta + \xi a/f_a$, giving rise to an effective potential through instanton effects, which can be approximated in the dilute gas approximation as

$$V_{\text{eff}} \sim \cos \bigg(\theta+\xi \frac{\langle a\rangle}{f_a}\bigg).$$

To minimize the ground state energy, the axion field picks the vacuum expectation value $\langle a \rangle = -f_a \theta/\xi$, with axions now being excitations around this vacuum. This prompts the field redefinition $a \rightarrow a+\langle a\rangle$ which leads to the cancellation of the $\theta$ angle, dynamically solving the strong CP problem. The axion is massive since the Peccei–Quinn symmetry is explicitly broken by the chiral anomaly, with the axion mass roughly given in terms of the pion mass and pion decay constant as $m_a \approx f_\pi m_\pi/f_a$.

== Invisible axion models ==
For the Peccei–Quinn model to work, the decay constant must be set at the electroweak scale, leading to a heavy axion. Such an axion has long been ruled out by experiments, for example through bounds on rare kaon decays $K^+ \rightarrow \pi^+ + a$. Instead, there are a variety of modified models called invisible axion models which introduce the new scalar field $\varphi$ independently of the electroweak scale, enabling much larger vacuum expectation values, hence very light axions.

The most popular such models are the Kim–Shifman–Vainshtein–Zakharov (KSVZ) and the Dine–Fischler–Srednicki–Zhitnisky (DFSZ) models. The KSVZ model introduces a new heavy quark doublet with PQ charge, acquiring its mass through a Yukawa term involving $\varphi$. Since in this model the only fermions that carry a PQ charge are the heavy quarks, there are no tree-level couplings between the SM fermions and the axion. Meanwhile, the DFSZ model replaces the usual Higgs with two PQ charged Higgs doublets, $H_u$ and $H_d$, that give mass to the SM fermions through the usual Yukawa terms, while the new scalar only interacts with the standard model through a quartic coupling $\varphi^2 H_u H_d$. Since the two Higgs doublets carry PQ charge, the resulting axion couples to SM fermions at tree-level.

== See also ==
- Axion
- QCD vacuum
- Strong CP problem
