= John G. King (physicist) =

American physicist

- Born: 1925; London, England
- Died: June 15, 2014 (aged 88–89); Wellfleet, Massachusetts
- Education: Massachusetts Institute of Technology
- Awards: Oersted Medal (2000)
- Scientific career
- Fields: Physics
- Workplaces: Massachusetts Institute of Technology
- Thesis: The hyperfine structure and nuclear moments of the stable bromine isotopes (1953)
- Doctoral advisor: Jerrold R. Zacharias

John Gordon King (1925–2014) was an English-born American physicist who was the Francis Friedman Professor of Physics (emeritus) at the Massachusetts Institute of Technology, the former director of MIT’s Molecular Beam Laboratory, and the former associate director of MIT’s Research Laboratory of Electronics.

== Career ==
Best known for his work on null experiments, King was also involved in the Physical Sciences Study Committee (PSSC) with his doctoral advisor Jerrold Zacharias. Additionally, he is the inventor of the molecular microscope. He has received the Alfred P. Sloan Award (1956), the American Association of Physics Teachers (AAPT) Apparatus Competition prize (1961), the AAPT Robert Millikan Medal (1965), the Danforth Foundation's E. Harris Harbison Award for Gifted Teaching (1971), and most recently the Oersted Medal from the AAPT in 2000.

King obtained undergraduate (1950) and graduate degrees (1953) in physics from the Massachusetts Institute of Technology and soon after he was appointed to the faculty there. As a young professor, he helped produce and acted in several PSSC educational movies, including Time and Clocks, Interference of Photons, Size of Atoms from an Atomic Beam Experiment, and Velocity of Atoms. King also developed innovative courses such as Concentrated Study, Project Lab, and Corridor Lab, which emphasized hands-on learning, independence of thought, and the scientific method.

King’s null experiments included searching for charge equality between the proton and electron, quarks, magnetic monopoles, and a variant of the continuous creation theory of matter proposed by Fred Hoyle, Thomas Gold, and Hermann Bondi.

== Selected articles and publications ==
- Brown, Howard H. and King, John G. "Hyperfine Structure and Octopole Interaction in Stable Bromine Isotopes." Physical Review, Vol. 142:1. 1966.
- Cohen, Samuel A. and King, John G. "Search for Hydrogen Appearing in Mercury Metal" Letters to Nature, MIT. 1969.
- Dylla, H. Fredrick "An Acoustic Means of Detecting An Electron-Proton Charge Difference." Master's Thesis, MIT. Advisor, John G. King. 1971.
- Dylla, H. Fredrick and King, John G. "Neutrality of Molecules by a New Method." Physical Review A, Vol 7:4. 1973.
- Jaccarino, Vincent. and King, John G. "On the Ratio of the Nuclear Magnetic and Electric Quadrupole Interactions for Atomic Cl-35 and Cl-37." Physical Review Letters, Physical Review, Vol. 83:2. 1951.
- Johnston, Wilbur D. and King, John G. "Field Ionization Detectors for Molecular Beams." The Review of Scientific Instruments, Vol. 37:4. 1966.
- King, John G., Coleman, John W., Jacobsen, Edward H. "Electron Optics" Research Laboratory of Electronics, P.R. 115, MIT. 1973.
- King, John G., Coleman, J.W. and Jacobsen, E.H. "A High-Resolution Auger Electron Microscope Using Foil Lenses." Annals of the New York Academyof Sciences, Vol. 306. March 1978.
- King, John G. and Jaccarino, Vincent. "Hyperfine Structure and Nuclear Moments of the Stable Bromine Isotopes." Physical Review Letters, Physical Review, Vol. 94:6. 1954.
- King, John G. et al. "Molecular Beams." Quarterly Progress Report, Research Laboratory of Electronics at MIT, no. 104. January 1972.
- King, John G. et al. "Molecule Microscopy" Research Laboratory of Electronics, P.R. 126, MIT. 1983.
- King, John G. “Observation, Experiment, and the Future of Physics.” American Journal of Physics, Vol. 69:1. January 2001.
- King, John G. and Romer, Robert H. "Physics on the Subway." The Physics Teacher, Vol. 40:3. March 2002.
- King, John G. "Search for a Small Charge Carried By Molecules." Physical Review, Vol 5:12. 1960.
- King, John G. et al."ZAP! freshman electricity and magnetism using desktop experiments: A progress report." American Journal of Physics, Vol. 60:11. November 1992.
- Sachs, Jason M. "An Interactive Servomechanism Demonstration." MIT Master's Thesis. Advisor, John G. King. 1996.
- Stephens, Peter W. and King, John G. "Experimental Investigation of Small Helium Clusters: Magic Number and the Onset of Condensation." Physical Review Letters, Physical Review, Vol. 51:17. 1983.
