= R. Michael Barnett =

American physicist

R. Michael Barnett, a physicist at the Lawrence Berkeley National Laboratory, was awarded the status of Fellow in the American Physical Society, after being nominated by the laboratory's Division of Particles and Fields in 1993. His award was for contributions to phenomenological analyses of the Standard Model and its extensions, including studies of the nature and validity of Quantum Chromodynamics, analyses of neutral current couplings, calculations of the production of heavy quarks, and predictions of the properties and decays of supersymmetric particles.

== See also ==
- List of fellows of the American Physical Society (1972–1997)
