= Strong CP problem =

Question of why quantum chromodynamics does seem to not break CP-symmetry

The strong CP problem is a question in particle physics, which brings up the following quandary: why does quantum chromodynamics (QCD) seem to preserve CP-symmetry?

In particle physics, CP stands for the combination of C-symmetry (charge conjugation symmetry) and P-symmetry (parity symmetry). According to the current mathematical formulation of quantum chromodynamics, a violation of CP-symmetry in strong interactions could occur. However, no violation of the CP-symmetry has ever been seen in any experiment involving only the strong interaction. As there is no known reason in QCD for it to necessarily be conserved, this is a "fine tuning" problem known as the strong CP problem.

The strong CP problem is sometimes regarded as an unsolved problem in physics, and has been referred to as "the most underrated puzzle in all of physics." There are several proposed solutions to solve the strong CP problem. The most well-known is Peccei–Quinn theory, involving new pseudoscalar particles called axions.

== Theory ==
CP-symmetry states that physics should be unchanged if particles were swapped with their antiparticles and then left-handed and right-handed particles were also interchanged. This corresponds to performing a charge conjugation transformation and then a parity transformation. The symmetry is known to be broken in the Standard Model through weak interactions, but it is also expected to be broken through strong interactions which govern quantum chromodynamics (QCD), something that has not yet been observed.

To illustrate how the CP violation can come about in QCD, consider a Yang–Mills theory with a single massive quark. The most general mass term possible for the quark is a complex mass written as $m e^{i\theta' \gamma_5}$ for some arbitrary phase $\theta'$. In that case the Lagrangian describing the theory consists of four terms:

$$\mathcal L = -\frac{1}{4}F_{\mu \nu}F^{\mu \nu} +\theta \frac{g^2}{32\pi^2}F_{\mu \nu}\tilde F^{\mu \nu} +\bar \psi(i\gamma^\mu D_\mu -me^{i\theta' \gamma_5})\psi.$$

The first and third terms are the CP-symmetric kinetic terms of the gauge and quark fields. The fourth term is the quark mass term which is CP violating for non-zero phases $\theta' \neq 0$ while the second term is the so-called θ-term or "vacuum angle", which also violates CP-symmetry.

Quark fields can always be redefined by performing a chiral transformation by some angle $\alpha$ as

$$\psi' = e^{i\alpha \gamma_5/2}\psi, \ \ \ \ \ \ \bar \psi' = \bar \psi e^{i\alpha \gamma_5/2},$$

which changes the complex mass phase by $\theta' \rightarrow \theta'-\alpha$ while leaving the kinetic terms unchanged. The transformation also changes the θ-term as $\theta \rightarrow \theta + \alpha$ due to a change in the path integral measure, an effect closely connected to the chiral anomaly.

The theory would be CP invariant if one could eliminate both sources of CP violation through such a field redefinition. But this cannot be done unless $\theta = -\theta'$. This is because even under such field redefinitions, the combination $\theta'+ \theta \rightarrow (\theta'-\alpha) + (\theta + \alpha) = \theta'+\theta$ remains unchanged. For example, the CP violation due to the mass term can be eliminated by picking $\alpha = \theta'$, but then all the CP violation goes to the θ-term which is now proportional to $\bar \theta$. If instead the θ-term is eliminated through a chiral transformation, then there will be a CP violating complex mass with a phase $\bar \theta$. Practically, it is usually useful to put all the CP violation into the θ-term and thus only deal with real masses.

In the Standard Model where one deals with six quarks whose masses are described by the Yukawa matrices $Y_u$ and $Y_d$, the physical CP violating angle is $\bar \theta = \theta - \arg \det(Y_u Y_d)$. Since the θ-term has no contributions to perturbation theory, all effects from strong CP violation are entirely non-perturbative. Notably, this gives rise to a neutron electric dipole moment

$$d_N = (5.2 \times 10^{-16}\text{e}\cdot\text{cm}) \bar \theta.$$

Current experimental upper bounds on the dipole moment give an upper bound of $d_N < 10^{-26} \text{e}\cdot$cm, which requires $\bar \theta < 10^{-10}$. The angle $\bar \theta$ can take any value between zero and $2\pi$, so it taking on such a particularly small value is a fine-tuning problem called the strong CP problem.

== Proposed solutions ==
The strong CP problem is solved automatically if one of the quarks is massless. In that case one can perform a set of chiral transformations on all the massive quark fields to get rid of their complex mass phases and then perform another chiral transformation on the massless quark field to eliminate the residual θ-term without also introducing a complex mass term for that field. This then gets rid of all CP violating terms in the theory. The problem with this solution is that all quarks are known to be massive from experimental matching with lattice calculations. Even if one of the quarks were essentially massless to solve the problem, this would in itself just be another fine-tuning problem since there is nothing requiring a quark mass to take on such a small value.

The most popular solution to the problem is through the Peccei–Quinn mechanism. This introduces a new global anomalous symmetry which is then spontaneously broken at low energies, giving rise to a pseudo-Goldstone boson called an axion. The axion ground state dynamically forces the theory to be CP-symmetric by setting $\bar \theta = 0$. Axions are also considered viable candidates for dark matter and axion-like particles are also predicted by string theory.

Other less popular proposed solutions exist such as Nelson–Barr models. These set $\bar \theta = 0$ at some high energy scale where CP-symmetry is exact but the symmetry is then spontaneously broken. The Nelson–Barr mechanism is a way of explaining why $\bar \theta$ remains small at low energies while the CP breaking phase in the CKM matrix is large.

== See also ==
- Axion
- CP violation
- CP violating moments
