= Kaluza–Klein–Christoffel symbol =

Five-dimensional Christoffel symbol

In Kaluza–Klein theory, a unification of general relativity and electromagnetism, the five-fimensional Kaluza–Klein–Christoffel symbol is the generalization of the four-dimensional Christoffel symbol. They directly appear in the geodesic equations of Kaluza–Klein theory and indirectly through the Kaluza–Klein–Riemann curvature tensor also appear in the Kaluza–Klein–Einstein field equations.

The Kaluza–Klein–Christoffel symbols are named after Theodor Kaluza, Oskar Klein and Elwin Bruno Christoffel.

== Definition ==
Let $\widetilde{g}_{ab}$ be the Kaluza–Klein metric. The Kaluza–Klein–Christoffel symbols are given by:

$$\widetilde{\Gamma}_{ab}^c
:=\frac{1}{2}\widetilde{g}^{cd}(\partial_a\widetilde{g}_{bd}+\partial_b\widetilde{g}_{ad}-\partial_d\widetilde{g}_{ab}).$$

== Properties ==
- For non-compactified spacetime indices, the Kaluza–Klein–Christoffel symbols don't reduce to the ordinary Christoffel symbols. Instead one has:
  $$\widetilde{\Gamma}_{\mu\nu}^\sigma
=\Gamma_{\mu\nu}^\sigma
-\frac{1}{2}A^\sigma\left(\partial_\mu\left(\phi^2A_\nu\right)+\partial_\nu\left(\phi^2A_\mu\right)\right).$$
- For compactified spacetime indices, the Kaluza–Klein–Christoffel symbols simplify with the cylinder condition:
  $$\widetilde{\Gamma}_{44}^\mu
=-\frac{1}{2}\widetilde{g}^{\mu d}\partial_d\widetilde{g}_{44}
=-\frac{1}{2}\widetilde{g}^{\mu\nu}\partial_\nu\widetilde{g}_{44}
=-\phi g^{\mu\nu}\partial_\nu\phi,$$
  $$\widetilde{\Gamma}_{44}^4
=-\frac{1}{2}\widetilde{g}^{4d}\partial_d\widetilde{g}_{44}
=-\frac{1}{2}\widetilde{g}^{4\nu}\partial_\nu\widetilde{g}_{44}
=\phi A^\nu\partial_\nu\phi.$$
- Analogous to the ordinary Christoffel symbol, but additionally using the relation $\widetilde{g}=\phi^2g$, one has:
  $$\widetilde{\Gamma}_{ab}^a
=\partial_b\ln\sqrt{-\widetilde{g}}
=\partial_b\ln\left(\phi\sqrt{-g}\right).$$

== Kaluza–Klein geodesic equation ==
The Kaluza–Klein Christoffel symbols are of particular importance in the Kaluza–Klein geodesic equation, which is the geodesic equation based on the Kaluza–Klein metric. These can be separated with respect to non-compactified and compactified spacetime indices with the respective simplifcations of the Kaluza–Klein Christoffel symbols above entering:

$$\begin{align}
\ddot{x}^\sigma
=-\widetilde\Gamma_{ab}^\sigma\dot{x}^a\dot{x}^b
&=\widetilde\Gamma_{\mu\nu}^\sigma\dot{x}^\mu\dot{x}^\nu
+2\widetilde\Gamma_{\mu 4}^\sigma\dot{x}^\mu\dot{x}^4
+\widetilde\Gamma_{44}^\sigma\left(\dot{x}^4\right)^2 \\
&=\left(-\Gamma_{\mu\nu}^\sigma
+A^\sigma\partial_\mu(\phi A_\nu)
\right)\dot{x}^\mu\dot{x}^\nu
+2\widetilde\Gamma_{\mu 4}^\sigma\dot{x}^\mu\dot{x}^4
-\phi g^{\sigma\kappa}(\partial_\kappa\phi)\left(\dot{x}^4\right)^2;
\end{align}$$
$$\begin{align}
\ddot{x}^4
=-\widetilde\Gamma_{ab}^4\dot{x}^a\dot{x}^b
&=\widetilde\Gamma_{\mu\nu}^4\dot{x}^\mu\dot{x}^\nu
+2\widetilde\Gamma_{\mu 4}^4\dot{x}^\mu\dot{x}^4
+\widetilde\Gamma_{44}^4\left(\dot{x}^4\right)^2 \\
&=\widetilde\Gamma_{\mu\nu}^4\dot{x}^\mu\dot{x}^\nu
+2\widetilde\Gamma_{\mu 4}^4\dot{x}^\mu\dot{x}^4
+\phi A^\sigma(\partial_\sigma\phi)\left(\dot{x}^4\right)^2.
\end{align}$$

The first equation now contains the ordinary geodesic equation $\ddot{x}^\sigma =-\Gamma_{\mu\nu}^\sigma\dot{x}^\mu\dot{x}^\nu$ with additional terms all coming from the additional dimension. The second equation is fully based on it.

A special case, which strongly simplifies both equations, is when there is no movement in any non-compactified dimension, meaning $\dot{x}^\mu=0$. In this case, there is only movement in the compactified dimension. The first equation then simplifies to $\ddot{x}^\sigma =-\phi g^{\sigma\kappa}(\partial_\kappa\phi)\left(\dot{x}^4\right)^2$, which means that (using $\phi\neq 0$, otherwise the Kaluza–Klein metric would become singular) the condition $g^{\sigma\kappa}\partial_\kappa\phi=0$ is required for this to stay the case. The second equation then simplifies to $\ddot{x}^4 =-\phi A^\sigma(\partial_\sigma\phi)\left(\dot{x}^4\right)^2$ and the front term $-\phi A^\sigma\partial_\sigma\phi$ is in fact a constant along the geodesic using $x^\mu=\mathrm{const}$ and the cylinder condition. For $a\neq 0$ a solution with additional constants of integration $b,c\in\mathbb{R}$ (which can be determined from the initial values $x^4(0)$ and $\dot{x}^4(0)$) is given by:

$$x^4(t)
=\frac{1}{a}\ln|at+b|+c;$$
$$\dot{x}^4(t)
=\frac{1}{at+b}.$$

This describes an asymptotic stop using $\lim_{t\rightarrow\infty}\dot{x}^4(t) =0$.

== Literature ==
- Overduin, J. M.; Wesson, P. S. (1997). "Kaluza–Klein Gravity". Physics Reports. 283 (5): 303–378. arXiv:gr-qc/9805018. Bibcode:1997PhR...283..303O. doi:10.1016/S0370-1573(96)00046-4. S2CID 119087814.
- Sabine Hossenfelder (2003). Schwarze Löcher in Extra-Dimensionen: Eigenschaften und Nachweis (PDF) (PhD thesis) (in German). Frankfurt am Main.
- Choquet-Bruhat, Yvonne (2008). General Relativity and the Einstein equations. Oxford Mathematical Monographs. Oxford University Press. ISBN 978-0-19-923072-3. ISSN 0964-9174.
- Pope, Chris. "Kaluza–Klein Theory" (PDF).
