= Kaluza–Klein metric =

Five-dimensional metric

In Kaluza–Klein theory, a unification of general relativity and electromagnetism, the five-dimensional Kaluza–Klein metric is the generalization of the four-dimensional metric tensor. It additionally includes a scalar field called graviscalar (or radion) and a vector field called graviphoton (or gravivector), which correspond to hypothetical particles. The Kaluza–Klein metric further leads to the Kaluza–Klein Christoffel symbols, Kaluza–Klein Riemann and Ricci curvature tensor as well as the Kaluza–Klein Einstein field equations.

The Kaluza–Klein metric is named after Theodor Kaluza and Oskar Klein.

== Definition ==
The Kaluza–Klein metric is given by:

$$\widetilde{g}_{ab}
:=\begin{bmatrix}
g_{\mu\nu}+\phi^2A_\mu A_\nu	& \phi^2A_\mu \\
\phi^2A_\nu						& \phi^2
\end{bmatrix}.$$

Its inverse matrix is given by:

$$\widetilde{g}^{ab}
=\begin{bmatrix}
g^{\mu\nu}	& -A^\mu \\
-A^\nu		& g_{\mu\nu}A^\mu A^\nu+\phi^{-2}
\end{bmatrix}.$$

Defining an extended gravivector $A_a=(A_\mu,1)$ shortens the definition to:

$$\widetilde{g}_{ab}
=\operatorname{diag}(g_{\mu\nu},0)
+\phi^2A_aA_b,$$

which also shows that the radion $\phi$ cannot vanish as this would make the metric singular.

== Properties ==
- A contraction directly shows the passing from four to five dimensions:
  $$g^{\mu\nu}g_{\mu\nu}=4,$$
  $$\widetilde{g}^{ab}\widetilde{g}_{ab}=5.$$
- If $\mathrm{d}s^2 =g_{\mu\nu}\mathrm{d}x^\mu\mathrm{d}x^\nu$ is the four-dimensional and $\mathrm{d}\widetilde{s}^2 =\widetilde{g}_{ab}\mathrm{d}\widetilde{x}^a\mathrm{d}\widetilde{x}^b$ is the five-dimensional line element, then there is the following relation resembling the Lorentz factor from special relativity:
  $$\frac{\mathrm{d}\widetilde{s}}{\mathrm{d}s}
=\sqrt{1+\phi^2\left(A_a\frac{\mathrm{d}x^a}{\mathrm{d}s}\right)^2}.$$
- The determinants $\widetilde{g}:=\det(\widetilde{g}_{ab})$ and $g:=\det(g_{\mu\nu})$ are connected by:
  $$\widetilde{g}
=\phi^2g
\Leftrightarrow
\sqrt{-\widetilde{g}}
=\phi\sqrt{-g}.$$

Although the above expression $\widetilde{g}_{ab} =\operatorname{diag}(g_{\mu\nu},0) +\phi^2A_aA_b$ fits the structure of the matrix determinant lemma, it cannot be applied since the former term is singular.

- Analogous to the metric tensor, but additionally using the above relation $\widetilde{g}=\phi^2g$, one has:
  $$\widetilde{g}^{ab}\partial_c\widetilde{g}_{ab}
=\partial_c\ln(-\widetilde{g})
=\partial_c\ln(-\phi^2g).$$

== Kaluza–Klein–Riemann curvature tensor ==
In Kaluza–Klein theory, a unification of general relativity and electromagnetism, the five-fimensional Kaluza–Klein–Riemann curvature tensor (or Kaluza–Klein–Riemann–Christoffel curvature tensor) is the generalization of the four-dimensional Riemann curvature tensor (or Riemann–Christoffel curvature tensor). Its contraction with itself is the Kaluza–Klein–Ricci tensor, a generalization of the Ricci tensor. Its contraction with the Kaluza–Klein metric is the Kaluza–Klein–Ricci scalar, a generalization of the Ricci scalar. Both are required in the Kaluza–Klein Einstein field equations.

The Kaluza–Klein–Riemann curvature tensor, Kaluza–Klein–Ricci tensor and scalar are namend after Theodor Kaluza, Oskar Klein, Bernhard Riemann and Gregorio Ricci-Curbastro.

=== Definition ===
Let $\widetilde{g}_{ab}$ be the Kaluza–Klein metric, which includes a graviphoton (or gravivector) $A^a$ and a graviscalar (or radion) $\phi$, and $\widetilde{\Gamma}_{ab}^c$ be the Kaluza–Klein–Christoffel symbols. The Kaluza–Klein–Riemann curvature tensor is given by:

$$\widetilde{R}_{acb}^d
:=\partial_c\widetilde{\Gamma}_{ab}^d
-\partial_b\widetilde{\Gamma}_{ac}^d
+\widetilde{\Gamma}_{ce}^d\widetilde{\Gamma}_{ab}^e
-\widetilde{\Gamma}_{be}^d\widetilde{\Gamma}_{ac}^e.$$

The Kaluza–Klein–Ricci tensor and scalar are given by:

$$\widetilde{R}_{ab}
:=\widetilde{R}_{acb}^c
=\partial_c\widetilde{\Gamma}_{ab}^c
-\partial_b\widetilde{\Gamma}_{ac}^c
+\widetilde{\Gamma}_{cd}^c\widetilde{\Gamma}_{ab}^d
-\widetilde{\Gamma}_{bd}^c\widetilde{\Gamma}_{ac}^d,$$
$$\widetilde{R}
:=\widetilde{g}^{ab}\widetilde{R}_{ab}.$$

Both formulas can be related to the ordinary Ricci tensor and Ricci scalar.

=== Properties ===
- The Kaluza–Klein Ricci tensor is given by:
  $$\widetilde{R}_{\mu\nu}
=R_{\mu\nu}
-\frac{1}{2}f_{4,\nu}^af_{\mu a}^4
-\frac{1}{2}\phi^{-1}\nabla_\mu\nabla_\nu\phi
+\frac{1}{4}\phi^{-2}\partial_\mu\partial_\nu\phi;$$
  $$\widetilde{R}_{\mu 4}
=\frac{1}{2}\nabla_a f_{4,\mu}^a
+\frac{1}{4}f_{4,\mu}^a\phi^{-1}\partial_a\phi;$$
  $$\widetilde{R}_{44}
=\frac{1}{2}(f_{4,ab}f_4^{ab}
+\phi^{-1}\partial_a\phi\partial^a\phi
-2\nabla_a\nabla^a\phi).$$
- Using the inverse Kaluza–Klein metric, the Kaluza–Klein Ricci scalar is given by:
  $$\begin{align}
\widetilde{R}
=\widetilde{g}^{ab}\widetilde{R}_{ab}
&=g^{\mu\nu}\widetilde{R}_{\mu\nu}
+2g^{\mu 4}\widetilde{R}_{\mu 4}
+g^{44}\widetilde{R}_{44} \\
&=R
-\frac{1}{2}g^{\mu\nu}f_{4,\nu}^af_{\mu 4}^4
-\frac{1}{2}\phi^{-1}\square_\nabla\phi
+\frac{1}{4}\phi^{-2}\square_\partial\phi
-2A^\mu\widetilde{R}_{\mu 4}
+\left(g_{\mu\nu}A^\mu A^\nu+\phi^{-2}\right)\widetilde{R}_{44}.
\end{align}$$
