= Kaluza–Klein–Einstein field equations =

Five-dimensional Einstein field equations

In Kaluza–Klein theory, a speculative unification of general relativity and electromagnetism, the five-dimensional Kaluza–Klein–Einstein field equations are created by adding a hypothetical dimension to the four-dimensional Einstein field equations. They use the Kaluza–Klein–Einstein tensor, a generalization of the Einstein tensor, and can be obtained from the Kaluza–Klein–Einstein–Hilbert action, a generalization of the Einstein–Hilbert action. They also feature a phenomenon known as Kaluza miracle, which is that the description of the five-dimensional vacuum perfectly falls apart in a four-dimensional electrovacuum, Maxwell's equations and an additional radion field equation for the size of the compactified dimension:

$$\text{D=5 vacuum Kaluza-Klein-Einstein field equations}\left\{\begin{array}{c}
\text{D=4 electrovacuum Einstein field equations} \\
\text{Maxwell's equations} \\
\text{radion field equation}
\end{array}\right.$$

The Kaluza–Klein–Einstein field equations are named after Theodor Kaluza, Oskar Klein and Albert Einstein.

== Kaluza–Klein–Einstein tensor ==
Let $\widetilde{g}_{ab}$ be the Kaluza–Klein metric, $\widetilde{R}_{ab}$ be the Kaluza–Klein–Ricci tensor and $\widetilde{R} :=\widetilde{g}^{ab}\widetilde{R}_{ab}$ be the Kaluza–Klein–Ricci scalar. The Kaluza–Klein–Einstein tensor is given by:

$$\widetilde{G}_{ab}
:=\widetilde{R}_{ab}-\frac{\widetilde{R}}{2}\widetilde{g}_{ab}.$$

This definition is analogous to that of the Einstein tensor and it shares the essential property of being divergence free:

$$\widetilde\nabla^a\widetilde{G}_{ab}
=0.$$

A contraction yields the identity:

$$\widetilde{G}
=\widetilde{g}^{ab}\widetilde{G}_{ab}
=\underbrace{\widetilde{g}^{ab}\widetilde{R}_{ab}}_{=\widetilde{R}}
-\frac{\widetilde{R}}{2}\underbrace{\widetilde{g}^{ab}\widetilde{g}_{ab}}_{=5}
=-\frac{3}{2}\widetilde{R}.$$

Since the five dimensions of spacetime enter, the identity is different from $G=-R$ holding in general relativity.

== Kaluza–Klein–Einstein field equations ==
The Kaluza–Klein–Einstein field equations are given by:

$$\widetilde{G}_{ab}
:=\kappa\widetilde{T}_{ab}.$$

Since $\widetilde{G}=0$ implies $\widetilde{R}=0$ due to the above relation, the vacuum equations $\widetilde{G}_{ab}=0$ reduce to $\widetilde{R}_{ab}=0$.

The Kaluza–Klein–Einstein field equations separate into:

$$G_{\mu\nu}
:=\frac{\phi^2}{2}T_{\mu\nu}^\mathrm{em}
-\frac{1}{\phi}\left(
\nabla_\mu\nabla_\nu\phi
-g_{\mu\nu}\square\phi
\right),$$
$$\nabla^\mu F_{\mu\nu}
=-3\frac{\partial^\mu\phi}{\phi}F_{\mu\nu},$$
$$\square\phi
=\frac{\phi^3}{4}F^{\mu\nu}F_{\mu\nu}.$$

Especially the first equation has the same structure as the Brans–Dicke–Einstein field equations with vanishing Dicke coupling constant. A contraction yields:

$$G
=g^{\mu\nu}G_{\mu\nu}
=\frac{\phi^2}{2}\underbrace{g^{\mu\nu}T_{\mu\nu}^\mathrm{em}}_{=0}
-\frac{1}{\phi}\big(
\underbrace{g^{\mu\nu}\nabla_\mu\nabla_\nu}_{=\square}\phi
-\underbrace{g^{\mu\nu}g_{\mu\nu}}_{=4}\square\phi
\big)
=\frac{3}{\phi}\square\phi
=\frac{3}{4}\phi^2F^{\mu\nu}F_{\mu\nu}.$$

Important special cases of the Kaluza–Klein–Einstein field equations include a constant radion field $\phi$ and a vanishing graviphoton field $A^\mu$. However, the radion field $\phi$ cannot vanish as well due to its division in the field equations, and because this would cause the Kaluza–Klein metric to become singular. The exact value of the constant is irrelevant for the second and third equation, but it is used for the prefactor in the right side of the first equation. Einstein's gravitational constant can be taken without loss of generality, since it can be aborded into the graviphoton field $A^\mu$ also appearing in the electromagnetic energy–stress tensor $T_{\mu\nu}^\mathrm{em}$ in second order.

For a constant radion field $\phi$, the field equations become:

$$G_{\mu\nu}
:=\kappa T_{\mu\nu}^\mathrm{em},$$
$$\nabla^\mu F_{\mu\nu}
=0,$$
$$F^{\mu\nu}F_{\mu\nu}
=0.$$

For a vanishing graviphoton field $A^\mu$, the field equations become:

$$R_{\mu\nu}
=-\frac{1}{\phi}\nabla_\mu\nabla_\nu\phi,$$
$$\square\phi
=0.$$

== Kaluza–Klein–Einstein–Hilbert action ==
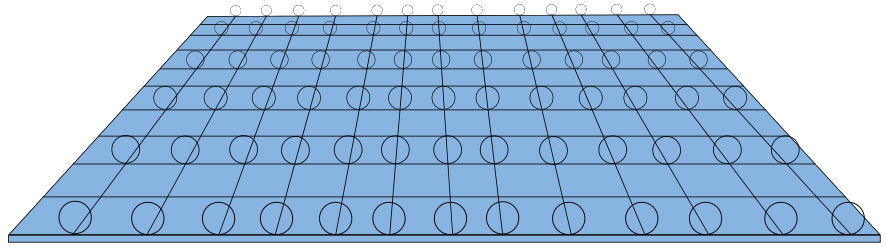
Visualization of the Kaluza–Klein compactification with a circle at every point of spacetime

Through the process of Kaluza–Klein compactification, the additional extra dimension is rolled up in a circle. Hence spacetime has the structure $\Sigma\times S^1$ with a four-dimensional manifold (or 4-manifold) $\Sigma$ and the circle $S^1$. Taking the canonical generalization of the Einstein–Hilbert action on this manifold with the metric and the Ricci scalar being replaced by the Kaluza–Klein metric and Kaluza–Klein–Ricci scalar results results in the Kaluza–Klein–Einstein–Hilbert action:

$$S_\mathrm{KKEH}
=\int_{\Sigma\times S^1}\mathrm{d}^5x\sqrt{-\widetilde{g}}\widetilde{R}
=\int\mathrm{d}x^4\int_\Sigma\mathrm{d}^4x\sqrt{-g}\phi\widetilde{R}$$

It is a special case of the Brans–Dicke–Einstein–Hilbert action with vanishing Dicke coupling constant as already reflected in the equations above. The integration $\int\mathrm{d}x^4$along the additional dimension is often taking into the gravitational constant.

== Literature ==
- Overduin, J. M.; Wesson, P. S. (1997). "Kaluza–Klein Gravity". Physics Reports. 283 (5): 303–378. arXiv:gr-qc/9805018. Bibcode:1997PhR...283..303O. doi:10.1016/S0370-1573(96)00046-4. S2CID 119087814.
- Sabine Hossenfelder (2003). Schwarze Löcher in Extra-Dimensionen: Eigenschaften und Nachweis (PDF) (PhD thesis) (in German). Frankfurt am Main.
- Choquet-Bruhat, Yvonne (2008). General Relativity and the Einstein equations. Oxford Mathematical Monographs. Oxford University Press. ISBN 978-0-19-923072-3. ISSN 0964-9174.
- Pope, Chris. "Kaluza–Klein Theory" (PDF).
