= Paul Halpern =

Philadelphia physicist and writer

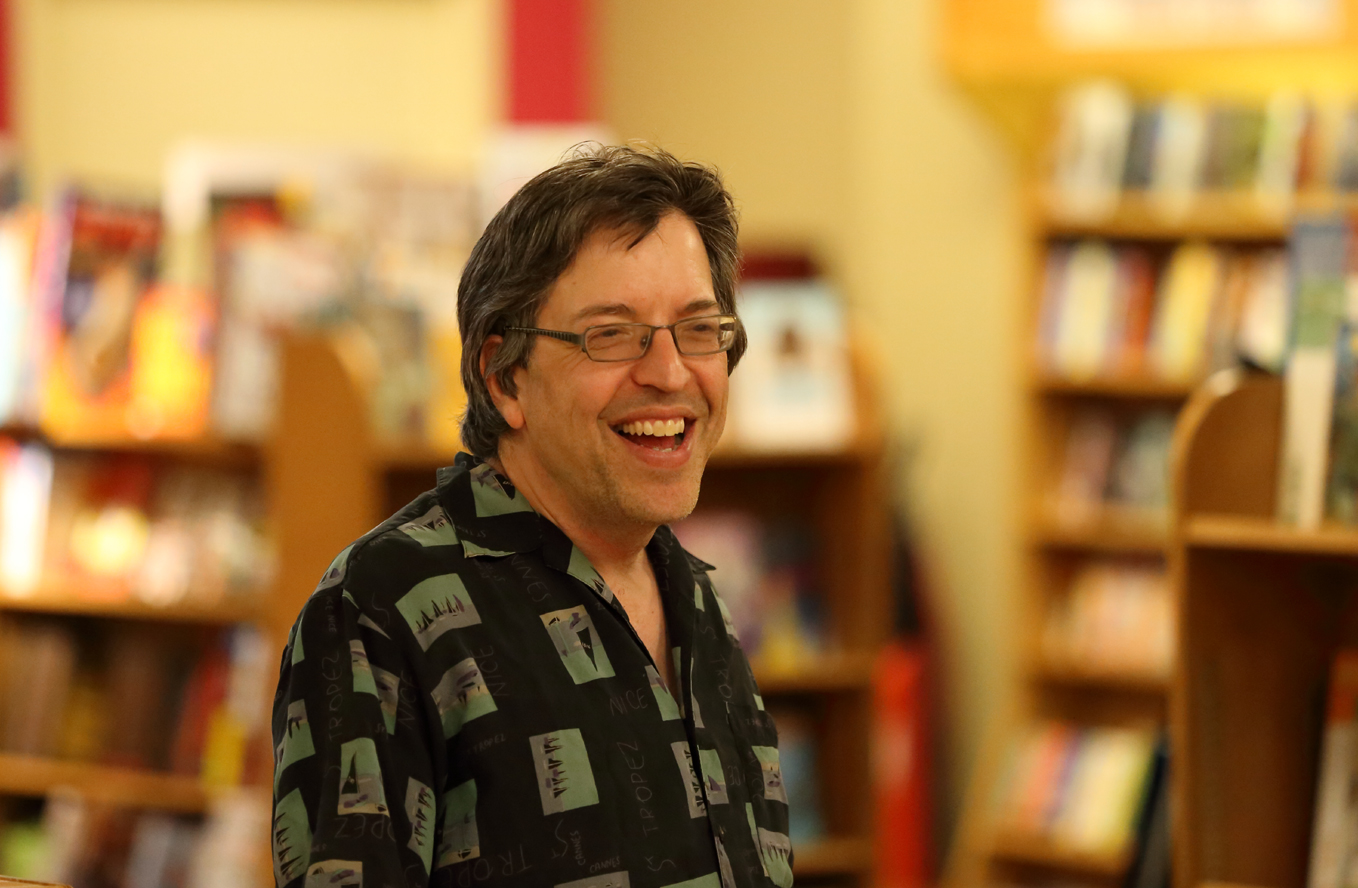
Paul Halpern

Paul Halpern (/ˈhælpərn/; born 1961) is an American author and professor of physics at Saint Joseph's University in Philadelphia.

== Life ==
Halpern studied at Temple University and graduated in 1982 with a B.A. in physics and mathematics. He went on to receive a master's degree in physics and later a Ph.D. in theoretical physics in 1987 from Stony Brook University.

In 2002, Halpern received a Guggenheim Fellowship. He has also received a Fulbright Scholarship and an Athenaeum Society Literary Award.

He has written many popular science books and articles, including the books The Cyclical Serpent, Cosmic Wormholes and The Great Beyond. He has also appeared on the 1994 PBS series Futurequest, as well as the National Public Radio show "Radio Times."

In 2007, he published a book based on The Simpsons titled What's Science Ever Done for Us. He later appeared in The Simpsons 20th Anniversary Special – In 3-D! On Ice!.

Halpern published Einstein's Dice and Schrödinger's Cat in 2015, The Quantum Labyrinth: How Richard Feynman and John Wheeler Revolutionized Time and Reality in 2017, Synchronicity: The Epic Quest to Understand the Quantum Nature of Cause and Effect in 2020, and Flashes of Creation: George Gamow, Fred Hoyle, and the Great Big Bang Debate in 2021.

In 2017 he was elected a Fellow of the American Physical Society.

== Works ==
- Time Journeys: A search for Cosmic Destiny and Meaning, McGraw-Hill Professional Publishing, 1990, ISBN 9780070257061
- Cosmic Wormholes: The Search for Interstellar Shortcuts, Plume, 1993. ISBN 9780452270299
- The Cyclical Serpent: Prospects for an Ever-Repeating Universe, 1995; The Cyclical Serpent: Prospects for an Ever-Repeating Universe. Springer. 11 November 2013. pp. 4–. ISBN 978-1-4899-6036-8.
- The Structure of the Universe. Henry Holt and Company. 16 September 2014. ISBN 978-1-4668-8168-6.
- The Pursuit of Destiny: A History of Prediction, Perseus Pub., 2000, ISBN 9780738200958
- Countdown to Apocalypse: A Scientific Exploration of the End of the World, Basic Books, 2000, ISBN 0738203580
  - Countdown to Apocalypse: Asteroids, Tidal Waves, and the End of the World. Plenum Trade. 1998. ISBN 0306459868. LCCN 98026982.
- The Quest for Alien Planets: Exploring Worlds Outside the Solar System. Perseus Books Group. 30 May 2003. pp. 4–. ISBN 978-0-7382-0890-9.
- Faraway Worlds: Planets Beyond Our Solar System, 2004, ISBN 1570916179 32 pages; children's book, illustrated by Lynette Cook
- The Great Beyond: Higher Dimensions, Parallel Universes and the Extraordinary Search for a Theory of Everything. John Wiley & Sons. 21 June 2004. pp. 2–. ISBN 978-0-471-65658-6.
- Brave New Universe: Illuminating the Darkest Secrets of the Cosmos, coauthor Paul S. Wesson, 2006, ISBN 0-309-10137-9
- What's Science Ever Done for Us?: What The Simpsons Can Teach Us About Physics, Robots, Life, and the Universe. John Wiley & Sons. 2007. Halpern, Paul (2011). pbk edition. Wiley. ISBN 978-0-470-11460-5. (See also The PTA Disbands#Reception.)
- Collider: The Search for the World's Smallest Particles. John Wiley & Sons. 3 August 2009. ISBN 978-0-470-28620-3.
- Edge of the Universe: A Voyage to the Cosmic Horizon and Beyond. John Wiley & Sons. 10 September 2012. ISBN 978-1-118-22082-5.
- Einstein's Dice and Schrödinger's Cat: How Two Great Minds Battled Quantum Randomness to Create a Unified Theory of Physics. Basic Books. 14 April 2015. ISBN 9780465040650.
- The Quantum Labyrinth: How Richard Feynman and John Wheeler Revolutionized Time and Reality. Basic Books. 17 October 2017. ISBN 9780465097593.
- Synchronicity: The Epic Quest to Understand the Quantum Nature of Cause and Effect. Basic Books. 18 August 2020. ISBN 9781541673649.
- Flashes of Creation: George Gamow, Fred Hoyle, and the Great Big Bang Debate. Basic Books. 17 August 2021. ISBN 9781541673618.
- The Allure of the Multiverse: Extra Dimensions, Other Worlds, and Parallel Universes. Basic Books. 16 January 2024. ISBN 978-1-5416-0217-5
