= Shmuel Sambursky =

German-Palestinian-Israeli physicist

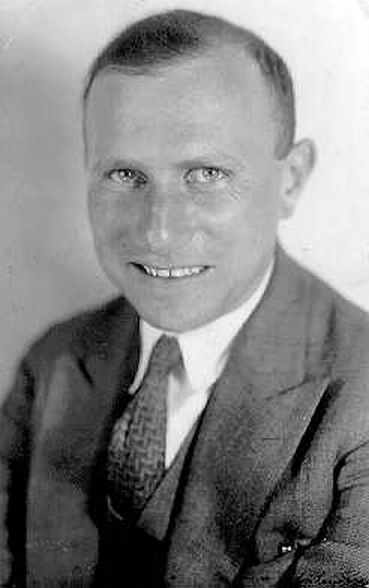
Shmuel Sambursky (1933)

Shmuel Sambursky, or Samuel Sambursky (Hebrew: שמואל סמבורסקי; 1900-1990) was a German-Israeli physicist, professor, and philosopher. He was a professor of Physics and Natural Sciences and Philosophy of Science at the Hebrew University. He was also a member of the Israel Academy of Sciences and Humanities. In 1968 he was awarded the Israel Prize in Humanities.

== Early life ==
Sambursky was born in Königsberg, Germany on the 30 October 1900. Educated at the University of Konigsberg, he wrote his PhD dissertation on proof by negation in Physics and Mathematics under the direction of Theodor Kaluza in 1923, Sambursky emigrated to Mandatory Palestine in 1924.

== Academic career ==
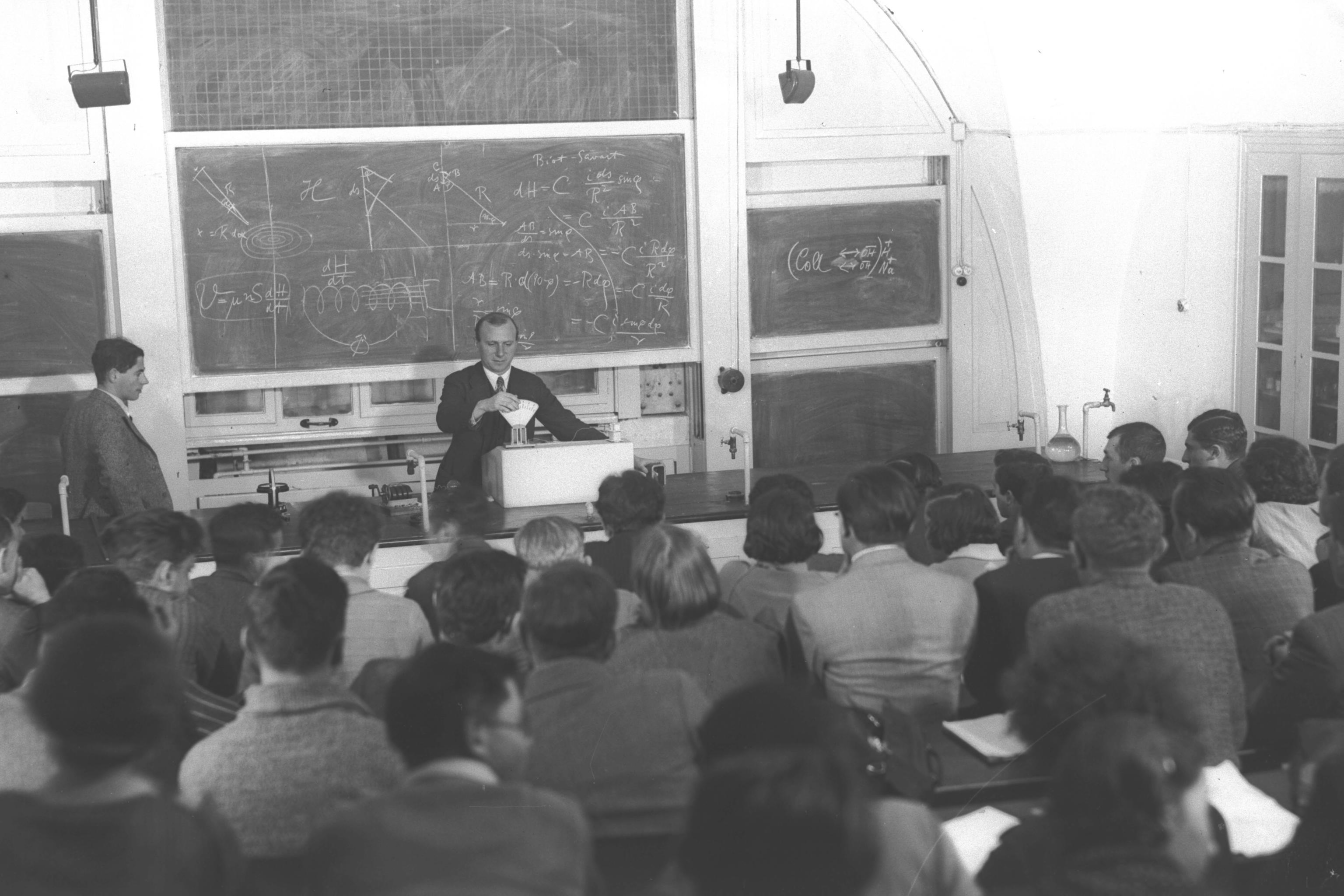
Professor Sambursky (1935), lecturing in the Institute of Physics, The Hebrew University in Jerusalem.

Through 1927 Sambursky taught at several high schools and at the David Yellin teacher's college. He was the first physicist to be appointed to the Hebrew University, which was then part of the Natural sciences department and remained there his entire academic career. He was among the founders of the physics department in 1931 and became associate professor in 1949. In 1961 he was appointed full professor. He was a popular lecturer due to his sense of history and humorous lecture style.

In 1947, he was appointed Executive Secretary of the Board of Scientific and Industrial Research, which was established in 1945 by the British Mandatory government. Sambursky remained at this institution, as the first director, when it became the Research Council of Israel in 1949. While continuing as the Vice Chairman of the Research Council, Sambursky became dean of The Hebrew University's faculty of science in 1957, and in 1959 founded and became a professor in the new department of history and philosophy of science.

Efraim Katzir, the fourth President of Israel and 1959 Israel prize winner in Life Sciences, was his student and wrote: "To you I owe thanks for broadening my horizons and instilling in me a love for sciences."

Sambursky was author and editor of multiple monographs on the history and philosophy of science, for classical antiquity.

== Awards and recognition ==
In 1962 he was admitted as a member of the Israel Academy of Sciences and Humanities.

In 1966 he received the Rothschild Prize in the Philosophy of Science.

In 1968 he received the Israel Prize for Humanities.

There is a street named after him in Beer Sheva.

== Death ==
Sambursky died on 18 May 1990 in Jerusalem and was buried in Har HaMenuchot.

== Selected books ==
- The Physical World of the Greeks, (1956)
- Physics of the Stoics, (1959)
- The Physical World of Late Antiquity, (1962)
- Physical thought from the Presocratics to the quantum physicists: An anthology, 1974, Hutchinson Press
- Concept of Place in Late Neoplatonism, (1982)
