= Paul S. Wesson =

Canadian theoretical physicist

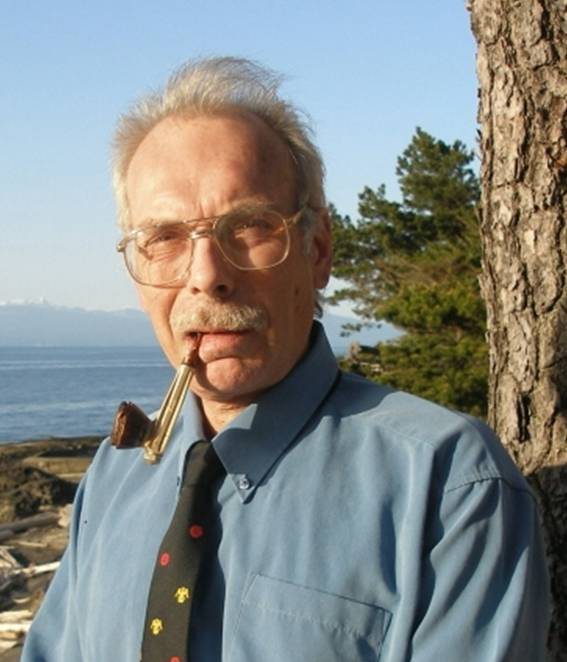
- Paul Wesson in 2006
- Born: September 11, 1949; Nottingham England
- Died: September 16, 2015 (aged 66); Gabriola Island BC
- Resting place: Gabriola Island Cemetery
- Spouse: Patricia Lapcevic
- Children: Sterling Wesson, Emily Wesson, Amanda Wesson, Jasper Wesson
- Scientific career
- Fields: Astrophysics, theoretical physics
- Workplaces: University of Waterloo

Paul S. Wesson, B.Sc., Ph.D., D.Sc., F.R.A.S (September 11, 1949 – September 16, 2015) was a professor of astrophysics and theoretical physics.

== Education and career ==
He studied at the University of London and University of Cambridge, then spent most of his career at the University of Waterloo. He also spent sabbatical leaves at the University of California, Berkeley, and Stanford University. In his later years, he worked with the Herzberg Institute of Astrophysics. He supervised numerous graduate students and postdoctoral fellows and served as Science Director of the California Institute for Physics and Astronomy.

== Interests and research ==
His scientific interests were broad, ranging from a seismic survey of Afghanistan to guest lectures and media interviews on the Big Bang in America. He published over 300 works, including nine textbooks and three science-fiction novels. Most of his articles appeared in the standard journals for astronomy and theoretical physics, but he also wrote pieces for New Scientist and other magazines of popular science. In later years, he characterized his research as concentrating on two subjects:

(1) The intensity of background light between galaxies depends on their luminosity and age, versus the redshift effect and the expansion of the universe. It was possible to use observations and a mathematical model to determine various astrophysical quantities, including the age of the universe and the nature of dark matter and dark energy. This approach also resolves the notorious problem of why the night sky is so dark, or Olbers' paradox.

(2) The general theory of relativity due to Einstein can be extended from four to five dimensions, where the extra dimension measures mass. This kind of 5D theory, a modified Kaluza–Klein theory, avoids problems of older versions and has gained a considerable following as a means of accounting for matter. A major discovery is that while the universe may have a big-bang singularity in 4D, it is smooth in 5D.

In addition to the above-outlined subjects, Wesson was interested in geophysics, bioastronomy, and the philosophy of science.

== Science books ==
- Principles of Space-Time-Matter: Cosmology, Particles and Waves in Five Dimensions (coauthor James Overduin), 2018, World Scientific, Singapore, 276 pp. [A posthumous summing up of Paul Wesson's work on higher-dimensional unified theory, prepared by Overduin based largely on notes and calculations left behind by Wesson at the time of his death.] ISBN 978-981-323-577-9
- Weaving the Universe (Is Modern Cosmology Discovered or Invented?), 2011, World Scientific, Singapore, 222 pp. [An account of the overlap between modern physics and philosophy, emphasizing the role of ideas.]
- The Light/Dark Universe (Light from Galaxies, Dark Matter and Dark Energy) (coauthor James Overduin), 2008, World Scientific, Singapore, 225 pp. [A research-level book which uses intergalactic radiation to constrain and identify dark components of the universe.] ISBN 978-981-283-441-6
- Five-Dimensional Physics, 2006, World Scientific, Singapore, 222 pp. [A research-level book on classical and quantum consequences of Kaluza-Klein cosmology.] ISBN 981-256-661-9
- Brave New Universe (coauthor Paul Halpern), 2006, Joseph Henry Press, Washington, 264 pp. [A semi-popular book on problems in modern cosmology and how they may be solved.] ISBN 0-309-10137-9
- Dark Sky, Dark Matter (coauthor James Overduin), 2003, Institute of Physics, London, 216 pp. [A research-level book on the modern version of Olbers' paradox and how background radiation is used to constrain decaying dark-matter particles.] ISBN 075030684X
- Space-Time-Matter, 1999, World Scientific, Singapore, 209 pp. [A research-level book on higher-dimensional gravity such as Kaluza-Klein theory and its implications for cosmology and astrophysics. The second edition is 2007, 254 pp.] ISBN 981-270-632-1
- Gravitation - A Banff Summer Institute (coauthor Robert B. Mann), 1991. World Scientific, Singapore, 650 pp. [An edited conference proceedings with contributions by many of the top researchers in gravitation.] ISBN 981-02-0751-4
- Gravity, Particles, and Astrophysics, 1980, Reidel, Dordrecht, 188 pp. [A research-level book on alternative theories of gravity and their implications for particle physics and astrophysics.] ISBN 90-277-1083-X
- Cosmology and Geophysics, 1978, Oxford University Press/Hilger, New York, 240 pp. [A research-level book on alternative theories of gravity and their implications for the Earth and the Solar System.] ISBN 0-85274-315-7

== See also ==
- List of University of Waterloo people
