= Oskar Klein =

Swedish physicist (1894–1977)

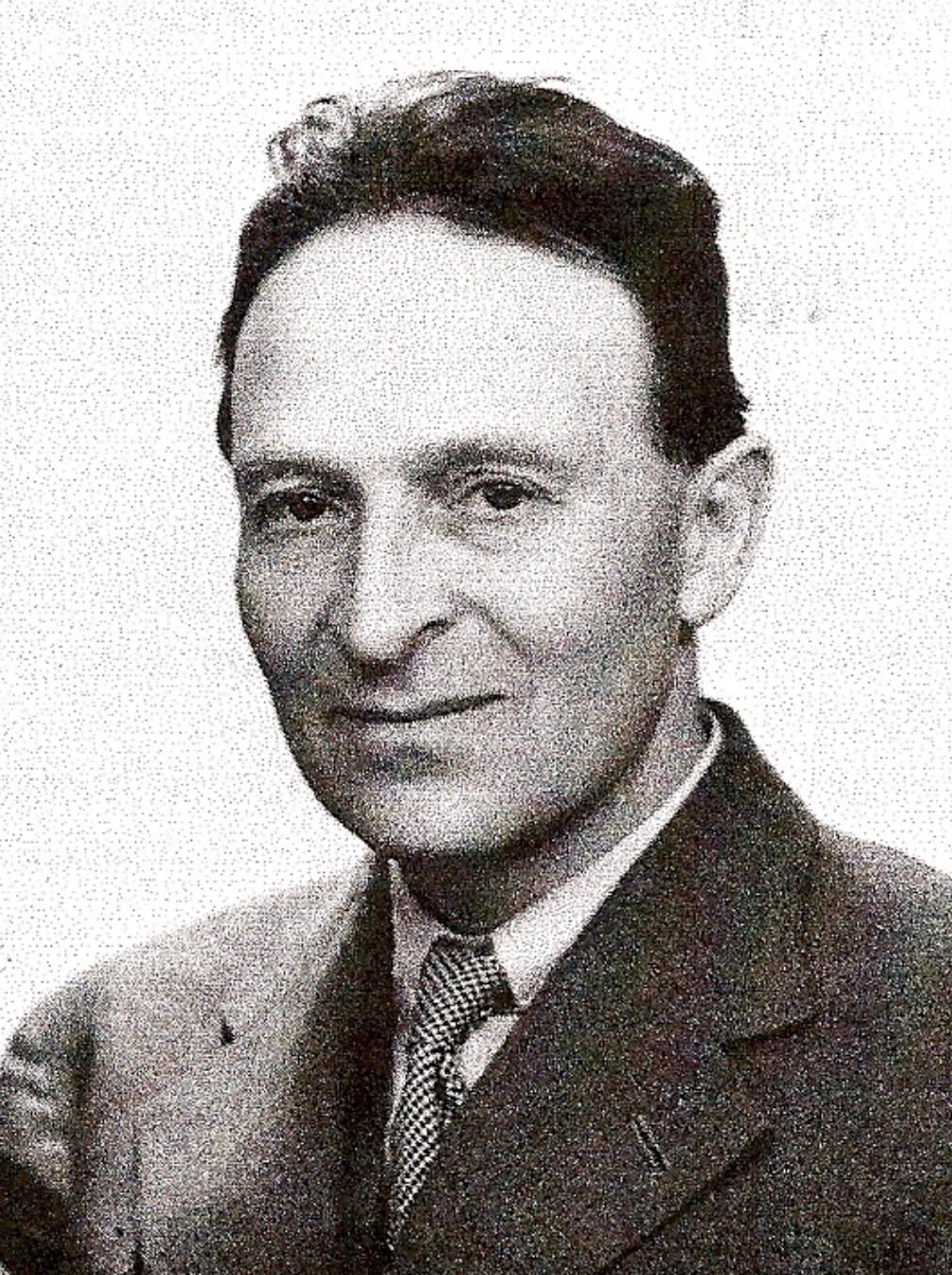
- Oskar Benjamin Klein (1894–1977).
- Born: 15 September 1894; Mörby, Sweden
- Died: 5 February 1977 (aged 82); Stockholm, Sweden
- Citizenship: Sweden
- Education: Nobel Institute; University College of Stockholm
- Known for: Klein paradox Klein–Gordon equation Klein–Kramers equation Klein–Nishina formula Alfvén–Klein cosmology Kaluza–Klein theory Rydberg–Klein–Rees method
- Awards: Björkénska priset (1937); Max Planck Medal (1959)
- Scientific career
- Fields: Physicist
- Workplaces: Copenhagen; University of Michigan; Lund University; University College of Stockholm
- Doctoral students: David M. Dennison

Oskar Benjamin Klein (Swedish: [ˈklajn]; 15 September 1894 – 5 February 1977) was a Swedish theoretical physicist now best remembered for the Klein-Gordon equation of relativistic quantum mechanics, the Kaluza-Klein theory, a unified field theory of gravitation and electromagnetism, and the Klein–Nishina cross section in quantum electrodynamics.

== Biography ==
Klein was born in Danderyd outside Stockholm, son of the chief rabbi of Stockholm, Gottlieb Klein from Humenné in Kingdom of Hungary, now Slovakia and Antonie (Toni) Levy. He became a student of Svante Arrhenius at the Nobel Institute at a young age and was on the way to Jean-Baptiste Perrin in France when World War I broke out and he was drafted into the military.

From 1917, he worked a few years with Niels Bohr in the University of Copenhagen and received his doctoral degree at the University College of Stockholm (now Stockholm University) in 1921. In 1923, he received a professorship at University of Michigan in Ann Arbor and moved there with his recently wedded wife, Gerda Koch from Denmark. Klein returned to Copenhagen in 1925, spent some time with Paul Ehrenfest in Leiden, then became docent at Lund University in 1926 and in 1930 accepted the offer of the professorial chair in physics at the Stockholm University College, which had previously been held by Erik Ivar Fredholm until his death in 1927. Klein was awarded the Max Planck Medal in 1959. He retired as professor emeritus in 1962.

Klein discovered in 1926 the Klein-Gordon equation, the simplest and prototypical example of relativistic wave equation. It describes the behavior of scalar fields, such as e.g., those associated to the pions. Walter Gordon, independently discovered and published the equation a few months later, as well as Vladimir Fock. The Klein-Gordon equation is an example of Stigler's law as it was first discovered by Erwin Schrödinger in 1925 but not published until after Klein, Gordon and Fock's papers because Schrödinger was initially discouraged by the fact that it did not give the right fine structure for the hydrogen atom.

Klein is also credited for inventing the idea, part of Kaluza–Klein theory, that extra dimensions may be physically real but curled up and very small, an idea essential to string theory.

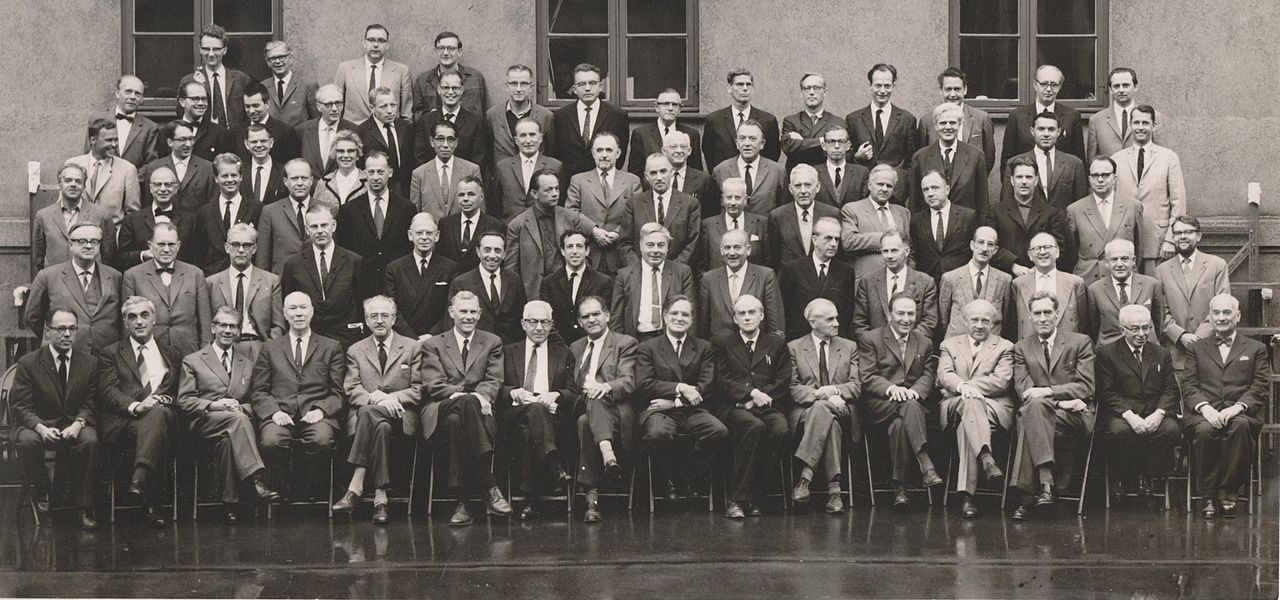
Oskar Klein (first row, fifth right) at the commemoration meeting for Niels Bohr in Copenhagen in 1963

In 1938, he proposed a boson-exchange model for charge-charging weak interactions (radioactive decay), a few years after a similar proposal by Hideki Yukawa. His model was based on a local isotropic gauge symmetry and anticipated the later successful theory of Yang–Mills.

Oskar Klein died on 5 February 1977 in Stockholm, Sweden.

The Oskar Klein Memorial Lecture, held annually at the University of Stockholm, has been named after him. The Oskar Klein Centre for Cosmoparticle Physics in Stockholm, Sweden is also in his honor.

== See also ==
- List of nominees for the Nobel Prize in Physics
